

472001–472100 

|-bgcolor=#fefefe
| 472001 ||  || — || October 30, 2002 || Kitt Peak || Spacewatch || NYS || align=right data-sort-value="0.60" | 600 m || 
|-id=002 bgcolor=#fefefe
| 472002 ||  || — || November 17, 2006 || Kitt Peak || Spacewatch || — || align=right data-sort-value="0.75" | 750 m || 
|-id=003 bgcolor=#fefefe
| 472003 ||  || — || May 20, 2012 || Mount Lemmon || Mount Lemmon Survey || V || align=right data-sort-value="0.57" | 570 m || 
|-id=004 bgcolor=#fefefe
| 472004 ||  || — || November 18, 2006 || Kitt Peak || Spacewatch || — || align=right data-sort-value="0.55" | 550 m || 
|-id=005 bgcolor=#E9E9E9
| 472005 ||  || — || December 10, 2004 || Socorro || LINEAR || — || align=right | 2.2 km || 
|-id=006 bgcolor=#fefefe
| 472006 ||  || — || October 24, 2013 || Kitt Peak || Spacewatch || NYS || align=right data-sort-value="0.66" | 660 m || 
|-id=007 bgcolor=#fefefe
| 472007 ||  || — || October 16, 2006 || Catalina || CSS || — || align=right data-sort-value="0.77" | 770 m || 
|-id=008 bgcolor=#fefefe
| 472008 ||  || — || January 17, 2007 || Kitt Peak || Spacewatch || NYS || align=right data-sort-value="0.63" | 630 m || 
|-id=009 bgcolor=#E9E9E9
| 472009 ||  || — || October 28, 2013 || Mount Lemmon || Mount Lemmon Survey || — || align=right | 1.6 km || 
|-id=010 bgcolor=#fefefe
| 472010 ||  || — || December 3, 1996 || Kitt Peak || Spacewatch || — || align=right data-sort-value="0.62" | 620 m || 
|-id=011 bgcolor=#fefefe
| 472011 ||  || — || October 31, 2013 || Kitt Peak || Spacewatch || — || align=right data-sort-value="0.72" | 720 m || 
|-id=012 bgcolor=#E9E9E9
| 472012 ||  || — || November 12, 2013 || Mount Lemmon || Mount Lemmon Survey || — || align=right | 1.1 km || 
|-id=013 bgcolor=#fefefe
| 472013 ||  || — || September 12, 2013 || Mount Lemmon || Mount Lemmon Survey || — || align=right data-sort-value="0.81" | 810 m || 
|-id=014 bgcolor=#E9E9E9
| 472014 ||  || — || November 28, 2013 || Kitt Peak || Spacewatch || — || align=right | 2.2 km || 
|-id=015 bgcolor=#E9E9E9
| 472015 ||  || — || October 3, 2013 || Mount Lemmon || Mount Lemmon Survey || — || align=right | 1.5 km || 
|-id=016 bgcolor=#fefefe
| 472016 ||  || — || October 4, 2006 || Mount Lemmon || Mount Lemmon Survey || — || align=right data-sort-value="0.71" | 710 m || 
|-id=017 bgcolor=#fefefe
| 472017 ||  || — || October 3, 2005 || Kitt Peak || Spacewatch || — || align=right data-sort-value="0.89" | 890 m || 
|-id=018 bgcolor=#d6d6d6
| 472018 ||  || — || December 22, 2003 || Kitt Peak || Spacewatch || — || align=right | 2.1 km || 
|-id=019 bgcolor=#E9E9E9
| 472019 ||  || — || January 7, 2010 || Kitt Peak || Spacewatch || EUN || align=right data-sort-value="0.86" | 860 m || 
|-id=020 bgcolor=#E9E9E9
| 472020 ||  || — || March 31, 2010 || WISE || WISE || — || align=right | 2.6 km || 
|-id=021 bgcolor=#d6d6d6
| 472021 ||  || — || April 13, 2011 || Mount Lemmon || Mount Lemmon Survey || — || align=right | 2.6 km || 
|-id=022 bgcolor=#E9E9E9
| 472022 ||  || — || May 23, 2011 || Mount Lemmon || Mount Lemmon Survey || — || align=right | 2.3 km || 
|-id=023 bgcolor=#E9E9E9
| 472023 ||  || — || December 10, 2009 || Mount Lemmon || Mount Lemmon Survey || — || align=right | 1.2 km || 
|-id=024 bgcolor=#E9E9E9
| 472024 ||  || — || November 28, 2013 || Mount Lemmon || Mount Lemmon Survey || — || align=right | 1.1 km || 
|-id=025 bgcolor=#fefefe
| 472025 ||  || — || December 23, 2013 || Mount Lemmon || Mount Lemmon Survey || — || align=right | 1.1 km || 
|-id=026 bgcolor=#E9E9E9
| 472026 ||  || — || December 20, 2009 || Mount Lemmon || Mount Lemmon Survey || — || align=right data-sort-value="0.89" | 890 m || 
|-id=027 bgcolor=#fefefe
| 472027 ||  || — || October 14, 2009 || Mount Lemmon || Mount Lemmon Survey || — || align=right data-sort-value="0.70" | 700 m || 
|-id=028 bgcolor=#E9E9E9
| 472028 ||  || — || January 27, 2006 || Catalina || CSS || — || align=right | 2.6 km || 
|-id=029 bgcolor=#d6d6d6
| 472029 ||  || — || July 2, 2010 || WISE || WISE || — || align=right | 2.7 km || 
|-id=030 bgcolor=#d6d6d6
| 472030 ||  || — || December 25, 2013 || Mount Lemmon || Mount Lemmon Survey || — || align=right | 2.5 km || 
|-id=031 bgcolor=#fefefe
| 472031 ||  || — || February 22, 2007 || Kitt Peak || Spacewatch || NYS || align=right data-sort-value="0.58" | 580 m || 
|-id=032 bgcolor=#E9E9E9
| 472032 ||  || — || December 14, 2013 || Mount Lemmon || Mount Lemmon Survey || — || align=right | 1.1 km || 
|-id=033 bgcolor=#E9E9E9
| 472033 ||  || — || November 26, 2013 || Mount Lemmon || Mount Lemmon Survey || — || align=right | 1.7 km || 
|-id=034 bgcolor=#E9E9E9
| 472034 ||  || — || December 10, 2013 || Mount Lemmon || Mount Lemmon Survey || — || align=right | 1.3 km || 
|-id=035 bgcolor=#fefefe
| 472035 ||  || — || December 12, 2006 || Kitt Peak || Spacewatch || — || align=right data-sort-value="0.63" | 630 m || 
|-id=036 bgcolor=#E9E9E9
| 472036 ||  || — || September 21, 2008 || Mount Lemmon || Mount Lemmon Survey || MAR || align=right | 1.3 km || 
|-id=037 bgcolor=#E9E9E9
| 472037 ||  || — || December 7, 2008 || Mount Lemmon || Mount Lemmon Survey || — || align=right | 2.5 km || 
|-id=038 bgcolor=#E9E9E9
| 472038 ||  || — || June 20, 2007 || Kitt Peak || Spacewatch || EUN || align=right | 1.5 km || 
|-id=039 bgcolor=#E9E9E9
| 472039 ||  || — || December 26, 2013 || XuYi || PMO NEO || EUN || align=right | 1.4 km || 
|-id=040 bgcolor=#E9E9E9
| 472040 ||  || — || June 7, 2010 || WISE || WISE || ADE || align=right | 2.3 km || 
|-id=041 bgcolor=#E9E9E9
| 472041 ||  || — || October 16, 2012 || Mount Lemmon || Mount Lemmon Survey || AGN || align=right | 1.2 km || 
|-id=042 bgcolor=#d6d6d6
| 472042 ||  || — || December 21, 2008 || Mount Lemmon || Mount Lemmon Survey || KOR || align=right | 1.5 km || 
|-id=043 bgcolor=#E9E9E9
| 472043 ||  || — || September 7, 2004 || Kitt Peak || Spacewatch || (5) || align=right data-sort-value="0.72" | 720 m || 
|-id=044 bgcolor=#d6d6d6
| 472044 ||  || — || December 24, 2013 || Mount Lemmon || Mount Lemmon Survey || — || align=right | 2.9 km || 
|-id=045 bgcolor=#E9E9E9
| 472045 ||  || — || January 6, 2010 || Mount Lemmon || Mount Lemmon Survey || EUN || align=right | 1.0 km || 
|-id=046 bgcolor=#E9E9E9
| 472046 ||  || — || October 28, 2013 || Mount Lemmon || Mount Lemmon Survey || — || align=right | 1.9 km || 
|-id=047 bgcolor=#E9E9E9
| 472047 ||  || — || September 29, 2008 || Mount Lemmon || Mount Lemmon Survey || — || align=right | 1.3 km || 
|-id=048 bgcolor=#fefefe
| 472048 ||  || — || August 15, 2009 || Kitt Peak || Spacewatch || — || align=right data-sort-value="0.65" | 650 m || 
|-id=049 bgcolor=#d6d6d6
| 472049 ||  || — || December 27, 2013 || Kitt Peak || Spacewatch || — || align=right | 3.3 km || 
|-id=050 bgcolor=#E9E9E9
| 472050 ||  || — || October 31, 2013 || Mount Lemmon || Mount Lemmon Survey || — || align=right | 1.2 km || 
|-id=051 bgcolor=#E9E9E9
| 472051 ||  || — || October 8, 2012 || Mount Lemmon || Mount Lemmon Survey || MAR || align=right | 1.2 km || 
|-id=052 bgcolor=#fefefe
| 472052 ||  || — || October 27, 2005 || Anderson Mesa || LONEOS || — || align=right data-sort-value="0.77" | 770 m || 
|-id=053 bgcolor=#fefefe
| 472053 ||  || — || December 27, 2006 || Mount Lemmon || Mount Lemmon Survey || V || align=right data-sort-value="0.51" | 510 m || 
|-id=054 bgcolor=#E9E9E9
| 472054 ||  || — || December 20, 2009 || Mount Lemmon || Mount Lemmon Survey || ADE || align=right | 1.9 km || 
|-id=055 bgcolor=#E9E9E9
| 472055 ||  || — || January 6, 2010 || Kitt Peak || Spacewatch || — || align=right | 1.5 km || 
|-id=056 bgcolor=#E9E9E9
| 472056 ||  || — || November 28, 2013 || Kitt Peak || Spacewatch || MAR || align=right | 1.2 km || 
|-id=057 bgcolor=#E9E9E9
| 472057 ||  || — || June 6, 2010 || WISE || WISE || — || align=right | 2.0 km || 
|-id=058 bgcolor=#fefefe
| 472058 ||  || — || October 12, 2009 || Mount Lemmon || Mount Lemmon Survey || NYS || align=right data-sort-value="0.61" | 610 m || 
|-id=059 bgcolor=#fefefe
| 472059 ||  || — || November 2, 2006 || Mount Lemmon || Mount Lemmon Survey || — || align=right data-sort-value="0.77" | 770 m || 
|-id=060 bgcolor=#d6d6d6
| 472060 ||  || — || October 17, 2012 || Mount Lemmon || Mount Lemmon Survey || — || align=right | 3.1 km || 
|-id=061 bgcolor=#fefefe
| 472061 ||  || — || September 28, 2009 || Catalina || CSS || — || align=right data-sort-value="0.91" | 910 m || 
|-id=062 bgcolor=#E9E9E9
| 472062 ||  || — || September 25, 2008 || Mount Lemmon || Mount Lemmon Survey || (5) || align=right data-sort-value="0.68" | 680 m || 
|-id=063 bgcolor=#d6d6d6
| 472063 ||  || — || May 17, 2010 || Kitt Peak || Spacewatch || — || align=right | 2.9 km || 
|-id=064 bgcolor=#E9E9E9
| 472064 ||  || — || December 20, 2009 || Mount Lemmon || Mount Lemmon Survey || — || align=right | 1.2 km || 
|-id=065 bgcolor=#fefefe
| 472065 ||  || — || February 23, 2007 || Kitt Peak || Spacewatch || — || align=right data-sort-value="0.89" | 890 m || 
|-id=066 bgcolor=#d6d6d6
| 472066 ||  || — || June 4, 2011 || Mount Lemmon || Mount Lemmon Survey || — || align=right | 3.0 km || 
|-id=067 bgcolor=#E9E9E9
| 472067 ||  || — || January 22, 2006 || Mount Lemmon || Mount Lemmon Survey || — || align=right data-sort-value="0.77" | 770 m || 
|-id=068 bgcolor=#fefefe
| 472068 ||  || — || October 6, 2005 || Mount Lemmon || Mount Lemmon Survey || — || align=right data-sort-value="0.71" | 710 m || 
|-id=069 bgcolor=#fefefe
| 472069 ||  || — || March 15, 2007 || Kitt Peak || Spacewatch || — || align=right data-sort-value="0.95" | 950 m || 
|-id=070 bgcolor=#E9E9E9
| 472070 ||  || — || December 28, 2013 || Kitt Peak || Spacewatch || — || align=right | 1.2 km || 
|-id=071 bgcolor=#E9E9E9
| 472071 ||  || — || January 15, 2005 || Kitt Peak || Spacewatch || — || align=right | 2.7 km || 
|-id=072 bgcolor=#E9E9E9
| 472072 ||  || — || September 20, 2008 || Mount Lemmon || Mount Lemmon Survey || — || align=right | 1.7 km || 
|-id=073 bgcolor=#E9E9E9
| 472073 ||  || — || December 28, 2013 || Kitt Peak || Spacewatch || GEF || align=right | 1.1 km || 
|-id=074 bgcolor=#E9E9E9
| 472074 ||  || — || December 31, 2005 || Kitt Peak || Spacewatch || — || align=right | 2.3 km || 
|-id=075 bgcolor=#d6d6d6
| 472075 ||  || — || March 26, 2010 || WISE || WISE || — || align=right | 3.7 km || 
|-id=076 bgcolor=#d6d6d6
| 472076 ||  || — || December 30, 2013 || Kitt Peak || Spacewatch || — || align=right | 2.3 km || 
|-id=077 bgcolor=#E9E9E9
| 472077 ||  || — || September 11, 2004 || Kitt Peak || Spacewatch || (5) || align=right data-sort-value="0.65" | 650 m || 
|-id=078 bgcolor=#E9E9E9
| 472078 ||  || — || September 23, 2008 || Mount Lemmon || Mount Lemmon Survey || — || align=right | 1.0 km || 
|-id=079 bgcolor=#fefefe
| 472079 ||  || — || November 10, 2009 || Mount Lemmon || Mount Lemmon Survey || — || align=right data-sort-value="0.86" | 860 m || 
|-id=080 bgcolor=#E9E9E9
| 472080 ||  || — || March 14, 2010 || Mount Lemmon || Mount Lemmon Survey || — || align=right | 1.7 km || 
|-id=081 bgcolor=#E9E9E9
| 472081 ||  || — || May 28, 2011 || Mount Lemmon || Mount Lemmon Survey || — || align=right | 1.0 km || 
|-id=082 bgcolor=#E9E9E9
| 472082 ||  || — || December 19, 2004 || Mount Lemmon || Mount Lemmon Survey || — || align=right | 2.3 km || 
|-id=083 bgcolor=#E9E9E9
| 472083 ||  || — || January 9, 1997 || Kitt Peak || Spacewatch || — || align=right | 1.4 km || 
|-id=084 bgcolor=#E9E9E9
| 472084 ||  || — || September 21, 2008 || Kitt Peak || Spacewatch || — || align=right | 1.4 km || 
|-id=085 bgcolor=#E9E9E9
| 472085 ||  || — || February 2, 2001 || Kitt Peak || Spacewatch || — || align=right | 1.4 km || 
|-id=086 bgcolor=#fefefe
| 472086 ||  || — || September 5, 2002 || Campo Imperatore || CINEOS || — || align=right data-sort-value="0.70" | 700 m || 
|-id=087 bgcolor=#E9E9E9
| 472087 ||  || — || September 29, 2008 || Mount Lemmon || Mount Lemmon Survey || EUN || align=right | 1.1 km || 
|-id=088 bgcolor=#E9E9E9
| 472088 ||  || — || December 21, 2000 || Kitt Peak || Spacewatch || — || align=right | 1.5 km || 
|-id=089 bgcolor=#fefefe
| 472089 ||  || — || November 28, 2013 || Mount Lemmon || Mount Lemmon Survey || — || align=right data-sort-value="0.71" | 710 m || 
|-id=090 bgcolor=#fefefe
| 472090 ||  || — || February 27, 2007 || Kitt Peak || Spacewatch || — || align=right data-sort-value="0.77" | 770 m || 
|-id=091 bgcolor=#E9E9E9
| 472091 ||  || — || October 8, 2004 || Kitt Peak || Spacewatch || — || align=right data-sort-value="0.84" | 840 m || 
|-id=092 bgcolor=#E9E9E9
| 472092 ||  || — || October 7, 2004 || Kitt Peak || Spacewatch || (5) || align=right data-sort-value="0.90" | 900 m || 
|-id=093 bgcolor=#E9E9E9
| 472093 ||  || — || October 29, 2005 || Mount Lemmon || Mount Lemmon Survey || BRG || align=right | 1.4 km || 
|-id=094 bgcolor=#E9E9E9
| 472094 ||  || — || October 7, 2008 || Mount Lemmon || Mount Lemmon Survey || (5) || align=right data-sort-value="0.91" | 910 m || 
|-id=095 bgcolor=#d6d6d6
| 472095 ||  || — || December 18, 2007 || Mount Lemmon || Mount Lemmon Survey || — || align=right | 3.2 km || 
|-id=096 bgcolor=#E9E9E9
| 472096 ||  || — || November 20, 2008 || Kitt Peak || Spacewatch || WIT || align=right | 1.1 km || 
|-id=097 bgcolor=#d6d6d6
| 472097 ||  || — || June 11, 2005 || Kitt Peak || Spacewatch || — || align=right | 2.8 km || 
|-id=098 bgcolor=#E9E9E9
| 472098 ||  || — || July 30, 2008 || Mount Lemmon || Mount Lemmon Survey || — || align=right data-sort-value="0.87" | 870 m || 
|-id=099 bgcolor=#E9E9E9
| 472099 ||  || — || November 21, 2009 || Mount Lemmon || Mount Lemmon Survey || — || align=right data-sort-value="0.95" | 950 m || 
|-id=100 bgcolor=#E9E9E9
| 472100 ||  || — || January 3, 2014 || Kitt Peak || Spacewatch || AGN || align=right data-sort-value="0.97" | 970 m || 
|}

472101–472200 

|-bgcolor=#E9E9E9
| 472101 ||  || — || February 9, 2010 || Catalina || CSS || — || align=right | 2.6 km || 
|-id=102 bgcolor=#d6d6d6
| 472102 ||  || — || April 15, 2010 || WISE || WISE || — || align=right | 5.9 km || 
|-id=103 bgcolor=#fefefe
| 472103 ||  || — || November 27, 2009 || Mount Lemmon || Mount Lemmon Survey || — || align=right data-sort-value="0.84" | 840 m || 
|-id=104 bgcolor=#E9E9E9
| 472104 ||  || — || January 3, 2014 || Mount Lemmon || Mount Lemmon Survey || — || align=right | 1.2 km || 
|-id=105 bgcolor=#E9E9E9
| 472105 ||  || — || October 1, 2008 || Kitt Peak || Spacewatch || HOF || align=right | 2.7 km || 
|-id=106 bgcolor=#E9E9E9
| 472106 ||  || — || August 12, 2012 || Kitt Peak || Spacewatch || — || align=right | 1.7 km || 
|-id=107 bgcolor=#E9E9E9
| 472107 ||  || — || December 28, 2013 || Kitt Peak || Spacewatch || — || align=right | 2.1 km || 
|-id=108 bgcolor=#d6d6d6
| 472108 ||  || — || June 21, 2010 || Mount Lemmon || Mount Lemmon Survey || — || align=right | 3.1 km || 
|-id=109 bgcolor=#fefefe
| 472109 ||  || — || May 27, 2012 || Mount Lemmon || Mount Lemmon Survey || — || align=right | 1.1 km || 
|-id=110 bgcolor=#E9E9E9
| 472110 ||  || — || July 30, 2008 || Kitt Peak || Spacewatch || — || align=right | 1.7 km || 
|-id=111 bgcolor=#E9E9E9
| 472111 ||  || — || December 15, 2009 || Mount Lemmon || Mount Lemmon Survey || MAR || align=right | 1.0 km || 
|-id=112 bgcolor=#E9E9E9
| 472112 ||  || — || October 26, 2008 || Mount Lemmon || Mount Lemmon Survey || — || align=right | 1.4 km || 
|-id=113 bgcolor=#E9E9E9
| 472113 ||  || — || December 20, 2009 || Mount Lemmon || Mount Lemmon Survey || — || align=right | 1.8 km || 
|-id=114 bgcolor=#fefefe
| 472114 ||  || — || July 5, 2005 || Kitt Peak || Spacewatch || — || align=right data-sort-value="0.97" | 970 m || 
|-id=115 bgcolor=#d6d6d6
| 472115 ||  || — || March 1, 2009 || Mount Lemmon || Mount Lemmon Survey || — || align=right | 3.2 km || 
|-id=116 bgcolor=#E9E9E9
| 472116 ||  || — || April 7, 2006 || Kitt Peak || Spacewatch || — || align=right | 3.4 km || 
|-id=117 bgcolor=#fefefe
| 472117 ||  || — || December 30, 2013 || Mount Lemmon || Mount Lemmon Survey || — || align=right data-sort-value="0.92" | 920 m || 
|-id=118 bgcolor=#E9E9E9
| 472118 ||  || — || November 3, 2008 || Kitt Peak || Spacewatch || — || align=right | 1.4 km || 
|-id=119 bgcolor=#fefefe
| 472119 ||  || — || August 29, 2005 || Kitt Peak || Spacewatch || — || align=right data-sort-value="0.71" | 710 m || 
|-id=120 bgcolor=#d6d6d6
| 472120 ||  || — || January 21, 2014 || Mount Lemmon || Mount Lemmon Survey || — || align=right | 2.6 km || 
|-id=121 bgcolor=#E9E9E9
| 472121 ||  || — || August 30, 2002 || Kitt Peak || Spacewatch || MRX || align=right | 1.2 km || 
|-id=122 bgcolor=#fefefe
| 472122 ||  || — || March 21, 2010 || WISE || WISE || — || align=right | 1.9 km || 
|-id=123 bgcolor=#fefefe
| 472123 ||  || — || January 23, 2006 || Kitt Peak || Spacewatch || — || align=right data-sort-value="0.75" | 750 m || 
|-id=124 bgcolor=#d6d6d6
| 472124 ||  || — || December 5, 2012 || Mount Lemmon || Mount Lemmon Survey || EOS || align=right | 2.2 km || 
|-id=125 bgcolor=#d6d6d6
| 472125 ||  || — || April 14, 2004 || Kitt Peak || Spacewatch || EMA || align=right | 2.5 km || 
|-id=126 bgcolor=#E9E9E9
| 472126 ||  || — || December 15, 2004 || Kitt Peak || Spacewatch || — || align=right | 1.9 km || 
|-id=127 bgcolor=#E9E9E9
| 472127 ||  || — || March 11, 2005 || Mount Lemmon || Mount Lemmon Survey || — || align=right | 2.1 km || 
|-id=128 bgcolor=#E9E9E9
| 472128 ||  || — || August 12, 2012 || Kitt Peak || Spacewatch || — || align=right | 2.4 km || 
|-id=129 bgcolor=#d6d6d6
| 472129 ||  || — || May 23, 2010 || WISE || WISE || — || align=right | 4.7 km || 
|-id=130 bgcolor=#d6d6d6
| 472130 ||  || — || September 17, 2006 || Anderson Mesa || LONEOS || — || align=right | 4.4 km || 
|-id=131 bgcolor=#d6d6d6
| 472131 ||  || — || November 3, 2007 || Kitt Peak || Spacewatch || — || align=right | 2.0 km || 
|-id=132 bgcolor=#E9E9E9
| 472132 ||  || — || February 16, 2010 || Catalina || CSS || — || align=right | 3.7 km || 
|-id=133 bgcolor=#E9E9E9
| 472133 ||  || — || October 21, 2008 || Kitt Peak || Spacewatch || — || align=right | 1.3 km || 
|-id=134 bgcolor=#d6d6d6
| 472134 ||  || — || December 6, 2008 || Kitt Peak || Spacewatch || EOS || align=right | 1.9 km || 
|-id=135 bgcolor=#d6d6d6
| 472135 ||  || — || November 19, 2007 || Kitt Peak || Spacewatch || — || align=right | 2.0 km || 
|-id=136 bgcolor=#E9E9E9
| 472136 ||  || — || April 28, 2011 || Kitt Peak || Spacewatch || MAR || align=right data-sort-value="0.96" | 960 m || 
|-id=137 bgcolor=#d6d6d6
| 472137 ||  || — || December 31, 2007 || Catalina || CSS || — || align=right | 4.6 km || 
|-id=138 bgcolor=#E9E9E9
| 472138 ||  || — || November 29, 2013 || Mount Lemmon || Mount Lemmon Survey || EUN || align=right | 1.5 km || 
|-id=139 bgcolor=#fefefe
| 472139 ||  || — || November 1, 2005 || Mount Lemmon || Mount Lemmon Survey || — || align=right data-sort-value="0.98" | 980 m || 
|-id=140 bgcolor=#E9E9E9
| 472140 ||  || — || October 7, 2008 || Kitt Peak || Spacewatch || — || align=right | 1.5 km || 
|-id=141 bgcolor=#E9E9E9
| 472141 ||  || — || October 17, 2012 || Mount Lemmon || Mount Lemmon Survey || — || align=right | 1.8 km || 
|-id=142 bgcolor=#d6d6d6
| 472142 ||  || — || December 14, 2001 || Socorro || LINEAR || — || align=right | 4.1 km || 
|-id=143 bgcolor=#E9E9E9
| 472143 ||  || — || March 4, 2005 || Mount Lemmon || Mount Lemmon Survey || — || align=right | 1.8 km || 
|-id=144 bgcolor=#E9E9E9
| 472144 ||  || — || January 8, 2010 || Mount Lemmon || Mount Lemmon Survey || EUN || align=right | 1.1 km || 
|-id=145 bgcolor=#d6d6d6
| 472145 ||  || — || May 16, 2010 || WISE || WISE || — || align=right | 3.8 km || 
|-id=146 bgcolor=#d6d6d6
| 472146 ||  || — || September 25, 2006 || Kitt Peak || Spacewatch || — || align=right | 2.6 km || 
|-id=147 bgcolor=#d6d6d6
| 472147 ||  || — || February 8, 2008 || Mount Lemmon || Mount Lemmon Survey || — || align=right | 2.4 km || 
|-id=148 bgcolor=#E9E9E9
| 472148 ||  || — || February 16, 2010 || Kitt Peak || Spacewatch || EUN || align=right | 1.3 km || 
|-id=149 bgcolor=#d6d6d6
| 472149 ||  || — || February 11, 1997 || Xinglong || SCAP || — || align=right | 3.9 km || 
|-id=150 bgcolor=#E9E9E9
| 472150 ||  || — || February 13, 2010 || Mount Lemmon || Mount Lemmon Survey || MAR || align=right | 3.5 km || 
|-id=151 bgcolor=#E9E9E9
| 472151 ||  || — || February 13, 2010 || Catalina || CSS || — || align=right | 2.3 km || 
|-id=152 bgcolor=#d6d6d6
| 472152 ||  || — || December 30, 2007 || Kitt Peak || Spacewatch || — || align=right | 2.9 km || 
|-id=153 bgcolor=#E9E9E9
| 472153 ||  || — || February 16, 2001 || Anderson Mesa || LONEOS || — || align=right | 2.5 km || 
|-id=154 bgcolor=#E9E9E9
| 472154 ||  || — || September 28, 2008 || Mount Lemmon || Mount Lemmon Survey || BRG || align=right | 1.1 km || 
|-id=155 bgcolor=#E9E9E9
| 472155 ||  || — || October 23, 2004 || Kitt Peak || Spacewatch || — || align=right | 1.2 km || 
|-id=156 bgcolor=#E9E9E9
| 472156 ||  || — || March 4, 2005 || Catalina || CSS || — || align=right | 3.1 km || 
|-id=157 bgcolor=#d6d6d6
| 472157 ||  || — || May 9, 2004 || Kitt Peak || Spacewatch || EOS || align=right | 2.2 km || 
|-id=158 bgcolor=#d6d6d6
| 472158 ||  || — || January 29, 2009 || Kitt Peak || Spacewatch || — || align=right | 2.3 km || 
|-id=159 bgcolor=#E9E9E9
| 472159 ||  || — || November 20, 2000 || Socorro || LINEAR || (5) || align=right data-sort-value="0.92" | 920 m || 
|-id=160 bgcolor=#E9E9E9
| 472160 ||  || — || October 26, 2008 || Kitt Peak || Spacewatch || — || align=right | 1.6 km || 
|-id=161 bgcolor=#E9E9E9
| 472161 ||  || — || September 3, 2008 || Kitt Peak || Spacewatch || (5) || align=right data-sort-value="0.92" | 920 m || 
|-id=162 bgcolor=#d6d6d6
| 472162 ||  || — || January 11, 2008 || Kitt Peak || Spacewatch || — || align=right | 4.2 km || 
|-id=163 bgcolor=#d6d6d6
| 472163 ||  || — || April 26, 2010 || WISE || WISE || — || align=right | 4.3 km || 
|-id=164 bgcolor=#E9E9E9
| 472164 ||  || — || April 6, 2010 || Mount Lemmon || Mount Lemmon Survey || — || align=right | 1.3 km || 
|-id=165 bgcolor=#d6d6d6
| 472165 ||  || — || January 30, 2014 || Kitt Peak || Spacewatch || — || align=right | 3.5 km || 
|-id=166 bgcolor=#E9E9E9
| 472166 ||  || — || September 21, 2008 || Mount Lemmon || Mount Lemmon Survey || EUN || align=right | 1.2 km || 
|-id=167 bgcolor=#d6d6d6
| 472167 ||  || — || February 9, 2008 || Mount Lemmon || Mount Lemmon Survey || — || align=right | 2.9 km || 
|-id=168 bgcolor=#d6d6d6
| 472168 ||  || — || September 17, 1995 || Kitt Peak || Spacewatch || EOS || align=right | 1.9 km || 
|-id=169 bgcolor=#E9E9E9
| 472169 ||  || — || December 30, 2013 || Mount Lemmon || Mount Lemmon Survey || — || align=right | 2.2 km || 
|-id=170 bgcolor=#E9E9E9
| 472170 ||  || — || February 2, 2005 || Kitt Peak || Spacewatch || — || align=right | 1.5 km || 
|-id=171 bgcolor=#d6d6d6
| 472171 ||  || — || March 28, 2009 || Mount Lemmon || Mount Lemmon Survey || — || align=right | 2.7 km || 
|-id=172 bgcolor=#E9E9E9
| 472172 ||  || — || April 10, 2010 || Mount Lemmon || Mount Lemmon Survey || — || align=right | 1.5 km || 
|-id=173 bgcolor=#d6d6d6
| 472173 ||  || — || September 14, 2006 || Kitt Peak || Spacewatch || EOS || align=right | 1.7 km || 
|-id=174 bgcolor=#d6d6d6
| 472174 ||  || — || August 18, 2006 || Kitt Peak || Spacewatch || — || align=right | 3.7 km || 
|-id=175 bgcolor=#E9E9E9
| 472175 ||  || — || April 4, 2005 || Mount Lemmon || Mount Lemmon Survey || — || align=right | 2.7 km || 
|-id=176 bgcolor=#d6d6d6
| 472176 ||  || — || January 1, 2008 || Kitt Peak || Spacewatch || THM || align=right | 2.1 km || 
|-id=177 bgcolor=#E9E9E9
| 472177 ||  || — || February 14, 2002 || Kitt Peak || Spacewatch || — || align=right | 1.1 km || 
|-id=178 bgcolor=#d6d6d6
| 472178 ||  || — || November 6, 2007 || Kitt Peak || Spacewatch || KOR || align=right | 1.5 km || 
|-id=179 bgcolor=#d6d6d6
| 472179 ||  || — || October 1, 2005 || Mount Lemmon || Mount Lemmon Survey || — || align=right | 2.6 km || 
|-id=180 bgcolor=#d6d6d6
| 472180 ||  || — || August 31, 2005 || Kitt Peak || Spacewatch || — || align=right | 5.4 km || 
|-id=181 bgcolor=#d6d6d6
| 472181 ||  || — || May 21, 2010 || WISE || WISE || — || align=right | 4.3 km || 
|-id=182 bgcolor=#d6d6d6
| 472182 ||  || — || August 21, 2006 || Kitt Peak || Spacewatch || — || align=right | 3.2 km || 
|-id=183 bgcolor=#E9E9E9
| 472183 ||  || — || November 23, 2003 || Kitt Peak || Spacewatch || MRX || align=right data-sort-value="0.94" | 940 m || 
|-id=184 bgcolor=#E9E9E9
| 472184 ||  || — || October 21, 1995 || Kitt Peak || Spacewatch || (5) || align=right data-sort-value="0.89" | 890 m || 
|-id=185 bgcolor=#E9E9E9
| 472185 ||  || — || September 22, 2003 || Kitt Peak || Spacewatch || — || align=right | 1.5 km || 
|-id=186 bgcolor=#E9E9E9
| 472186 ||  || — || February 28, 2000 || Kitt Peak || Spacewatch || — || align=right | 2.2 km || 
|-id=187 bgcolor=#E9E9E9
| 472187 ||  || — || December 18, 2004 || Mount Lemmon || Mount Lemmon Survey || MIS || align=right | 2.3 km || 
|-id=188 bgcolor=#d6d6d6
| 472188 ||  || — || November 5, 2007 || Kitt Peak || Spacewatch || KOR || align=right | 1.3 km || 
|-id=189 bgcolor=#E9E9E9
| 472189 ||  || — || January 13, 2005 || Kitt Peak || Spacewatch || — || align=right | 1.2 km || 
|-id=190 bgcolor=#E9E9E9
| 472190 ||  || — || September 12, 2007 || Mount Lemmon || Mount Lemmon Survey || — || align=right | 1.8 km || 
|-id=191 bgcolor=#E9E9E9
| 472191 ||  || — || October 6, 2008 || Mount Lemmon || Mount Lemmon Survey || — || align=right data-sort-value="0.95" | 950 m || 
|-id=192 bgcolor=#d6d6d6
| 472192 ||  || — || February 12, 2008 || Mount Lemmon || Mount Lemmon Survey || — || align=right | 3.0 km || 
|-id=193 bgcolor=#d6d6d6
| 472193 ||  || — || October 10, 2007 || Kitt Peak || Spacewatch || KOR || align=right | 1.3 km || 
|-id=194 bgcolor=#d6d6d6
| 472194 ||  || — || March 14, 2010 || WISE || WISE || — || align=right | 3.2 km || 
|-id=195 bgcolor=#E9E9E9
| 472195 ||  || — || October 10, 2007 || Mount Lemmon || Mount Lemmon Survey || — || align=right | 2.8 km || 
|-id=196 bgcolor=#E9E9E9
| 472196 ||  || — || October 7, 1996 || Kitt Peak || Spacewatch || — || align=right data-sort-value="0.99" | 990 m || 
|-id=197 bgcolor=#d6d6d6
| 472197 ||  || — || August 19, 2006 || Kitt Peak || Spacewatch || — || align=right | 3.5 km || 
|-id=198 bgcolor=#d6d6d6
| 472198 ||  || — || September 18, 2011 || Mount Lemmon || Mount Lemmon Survey || — || align=right | 2.6 km || 
|-id=199 bgcolor=#d6d6d6
| 472199 ||  || — || February 25, 2003 || Campo Imperatore || CINEOS || — || align=right | 2.6 km || 
|-id=200 bgcolor=#d6d6d6
| 472200 ||  || — || January 14, 2008 || Kitt Peak || Spacewatch || EOS || align=right | 1.8 km || 
|}

472201–472300 

|-bgcolor=#d6d6d6
| 472201 ||  || — || August 27, 2006 || Kitt Peak || Spacewatch || EMA || align=right | 3.2 km || 
|-id=202 bgcolor=#d6d6d6
| 472202 ||  || — || December 18, 2007 || Mount Lemmon || Mount Lemmon Survey || — || align=right | 2.7 km || 
|-id=203 bgcolor=#E9E9E9
| 472203 ||  || — || December 21, 2008 || Mount Lemmon || Mount Lemmon Survey || — || align=right | 1.4 km || 
|-id=204 bgcolor=#d6d6d6
| 472204 ||  || — || November 18, 2007 || Mount Lemmon || Mount Lemmon Survey || — || align=right | 2.0 km || 
|-id=205 bgcolor=#E9E9E9
| 472205 ||  || — || October 20, 2003 || Kitt Peak || Spacewatch || — || align=right | 1.8 km || 
|-id=206 bgcolor=#d6d6d6
| 472206 ||  || — || January 16, 2008 || Kitt Peak || Spacewatch || HYG || align=right | 2.7 km || 
|-id=207 bgcolor=#E9E9E9
| 472207 ||  || — || February 20, 2006 || Catalina || CSS || — || align=right | 1.2 km || 
|-id=208 bgcolor=#d6d6d6
| 472208 ||  || — || May 16, 2010 || WISE || WISE || — || align=right | 3.7 km || 
|-id=209 bgcolor=#E9E9E9
| 472209 ||  || — || January 1, 2009 || Kitt Peak || Spacewatch || — || align=right | 2.0 km || 
|-id=210 bgcolor=#d6d6d6
| 472210 ||  || — || June 27, 2011 || Mount Lemmon || Mount Lemmon Survey || — || align=right | 3.2 km || 
|-id=211 bgcolor=#C2FFFF
| 472211 ||  || — || December 4, 2010 || Mount Lemmon || Mount Lemmon Survey || L4 || align=right | 7.4 km || 
|-id=212 bgcolor=#d6d6d6
| 472212 ||  || — || December 3, 2012 || Mount Lemmon || Mount Lemmon Survey || — || align=right | 2.5 km || 
|-id=213 bgcolor=#d6d6d6
| 472213 ||  || — || February 13, 2004 || Kitt Peak || Spacewatch || — || align=right | 2.5 km || 
|-id=214 bgcolor=#E9E9E9
| 472214 ||  || — || September 20, 2007 || Kitt Peak || Spacewatch || — || align=right | 2.8 km || 
|-id=215 bgcolor=#d6d6d6
| 472215 ||  || — || February 8, 2008 || Mount Lemmon || Mount Lemmon Survey || — || align=right | 3.3 km || 
|-id=216 bgcolor=#E9E9E9
| 472216 ||  || — || October 12, 2007 || Kitt Peak || Spacewatch || — || align=right | 2.6 km || 
|-id=217 bgcolor=#d6d6d6
| 472217 ||  || — || February 20, 2009 || Mount Lemmon || Mount Lemmon Survey || — || align=right | 2.4 km || 
|-id=218 bgcolor=#d6d6d6
| 472218 ||  || — || March 2, 2009 || Mount Lemmon || Mount Lemmon Survey || — || align=right | 2.4 km || 
|-id=219 bgcolor=#fefefe
| 472219 ||  || — || July 16, 2004 || Siding Spring || SSS || H || align=right data-sort-value="0.85" | 850 m || 
|-id=220 bgcolor=#d6d6d6
| 472220 ||  || — || November 16, 2006 || Kitt Peak || Spacewatch || EOS || align=right | 1.9 km || 
|-id=221 bgcolor=#d6d6d6
| 472221 ||  || — || November 16, 2006 || Kitt Peak || Spacewatch || — || align=right | 2.6 km || 
|-id=222 bgcolor=#d6d6d6
| 472222 ||  || — || November 26, 2012 || Mount Lemmon || Mount Lemmon Survey || — || align=right | 2.3 km || 
|-id=223 bgcolor=#d6d6d6
| 472223 ||  || — || January 10, 2008 || Mount Lemmon || Mount Lemmon Survey || — || align=right | 2.5 km || 
|-id=224 bgcolor=#d6d6d6
| 472224 ||  || — || September 28, 2006 || Catalina || CSS || EOS || align=right | 2.8 km || 
|-id=225 bgcolor=#d6d6d6
| 472225 ||  || — || April 4, 2003 || Kitt Peak || Spacewatch || VER || align=right | 2.5 km || 
|-id=226 bgcolor=#d6d6d6
| 472226 ||  || — || February 3, 2008 || Kitt Peak || Spacewatch || VER || align=right | 2.5 km || 
|-id=227 bgcolor=#E9E9E9
| 472227 ||  || — || October 16, 2012 || Catalina || CSS || EUN || align=right | 1.6 km || 
|-id=228 bgcolor=#d6d6d6
| 472228 ||  || — || June 18, 2010 || WISE || WISE || 7:4 || align=right | 5.0 km || 
|-id=229 bgcolor=#E9E9E9
| 472229 ||  || — || September 26, 2003 || Desert Eagle || W. K. Y. Yeung || — || align=right | 2.0 km || 
|-id=230 bgcolor=#d6d6d6
| 472230 ||  || — || November 20, 2007 || Mount Lemmon || Mount Lemmon Survey || — || align=right | 3.3 km || 
|-id=231 bgcolor=#C2E0FF
| 472231 ||  || — || March 28, 2014 || Cerro Tololo || Cerro Tololo Obs. || cubewano (cold) || align=right | 308 km || 
|-id=232 bgcolor=#C2E0FF
| 472232 ||  || — || March 27, 2014 || Cerro Tololo || Cerro Tololo Obs. || cubewano?critical || align=right | 277 km || 
|-id=233 bgcolor=#d6d6d6
| 472233 ||  || — || December 5, 2007 || Kitt Peak || Spacewatch || — || align=right | 3.9 km || 
|-id=234 bgcolor=#d6d6d6
| 472234 ||  || — || February 2, 2008 || Mount Lemmon || Mount Lemmon Survey || EOS || align=right | 1.5 km || 
|-id=235 bgcolor=#C2E0FF
| 472235 Zhulong ||  ||  || April 4, 2014 || Haleakala || Pan-STARRS || res2:5critical || align=right | 217 km || 
|-id=236 bgcolor=#d6d6d6
| 472236 ||  || — || August 29, 2006 || Catalina || CSS || — || align=right | 3.0 km || 
|-id=237 bgcolor=#d6d6d6
| 472237 ||  || — || October 25, 2011 || XuYi || PMO NEO || — || align=right | 3.8 km || 
|-id=238 bgcolor=#d6d6d6
| 472238 ||  || — || August 27, 2006 || Kitt Peak || Spacewatch || — || align=right | 2.4 km || 
|-id=239 bgcolor=#d6d6d6
| 472239 ||  || — || February 7, 2002 || Kitt Peak || Spacewatch || — || align=right | 2.9 km || 
|-id=240 bgcolor=#E9E9E9
| 472240 ||  || — || March 21, 2009 || Mount Lemmon || Mount Lemmon Survey || — || align=right | 2.4 km || 
|-id=241 bgcolor=#d6d6d6
| 472241 ||  || — || September 18, 2011 || Mount Lemmon || Mount Lemmon Survey || EOS || align=right | 1.9 km || 
|-id=242 bgcolor=#d6d6d6
| 472242 ||  || — || September 30, 2005 || Kitt Peak || Spacewatch || — || align=right | 3.2 km || 
|-id=243 bgcolor=#fefefe
| 472243 ||  || — || November 5, 2005 || Catalina || CSS || — || align=right data-sort-value="0.63" | 630 m || 
|-id=244 bgcolor=#E9E9E9
| 472244 ||  || — || September 30, 2006 || Catalina || CSS || — || align=right | 1.7 km || 
|-id=245 bgcolor=#fefefe
| 472245 ||  || — || May 28, 2004 || Kitt Peak || Spacewatch || H || align=right data-sort-value="0.65" | 650 m || 
|-id=246 bgcolor=#d6d6d6
| 472246 ||  || — || August 29, 2005 || Kitt Peak || Spacewatch || — || align=right | 2.6 km || 
|-id=247 bgcolor=#E9E9E9
| 472247 ||  || — || January 15, 2008 || Mount Lemmon || Mount Lemmon Survey || — || align=right | 2.1 km || 
|-id=248 bgcolor=#fefefe
| 472248 ||  || — || December 10, 2010 || Mount Lemmon || Mount Lemmon Survey || H || align=right data-sort-value="0.53" | 530 m || 
|-id=249 bgcolor=#d6d6d6
| 472249 ||  || — || December 8, 2010 || Mount Lemmon || Mount Lemmon Survey || — || align=right | 2.9 km || 
|-id=250 bgcolor=#d6d6d6
| 472250 ||  || — || February 7, 2008 || Socorro || LINEAR || Tj (2.99) || align=right | 3.9 km || 
|-id=251 bgcolor=#d6d6d6
| 472251 ||  || — || January 2, 2011 || Mount Lemmon || Mount Lemmon Survey || — || align=right | 3.2 km || 
|-id=252 bgcolor=#d6d6d6
| 472252 ||  || — || September 25, 2009 || Catalina || CSS || — || align=right | 3.0 km || 
|-id=253 bgcolor=#FA8072
| 472253 ||  || — || January 21, 2001 || Socorro || LINEAR || — || align=right data-sort-value="0.45" | 450 m || 
|-id=254 bgcolor=#d6d6d6
| 472254 ||  || — || September 27, 2009 || Mount Lemmon || Mount Lemmon Survey || — || align=right | 2.6 km || 
|-id=255 bgcolor=#d6d6d6
| 472255 ||  || — || December 5, 1999 || Kitt Peak || Spacewatch || — || align=right | 3.2 km || 
|-id=256 bgcolor=#E9E9E9
| 472256 ||  || — || December 1, 2006 || Mount Lemmon || Mount Lemmon Survey || AGN || align=right | 1.3 km || 
|-id=257 bgcolor=#d6d6d6
| 472257 ||  || — || November 1, 1999 || Kitt Peak || Spacewatch || — || align=right | 2.2 km || 
|-id=258 bgcolor=#d6d6d6
| 472258 ||  || — || January 17, 2007 || Catalina || CSS || BRA || align=right | 1.5 km || 
|-id=259 bgcolor=#d6d6d6
| 472259 ||  || — || November 30, 2005 || Kitt Peak || Spacewatch || — || align=right | 3.7 km || 
|-id=260 bgcolor=#fefefe
| 472260 ||  || — || August 6, 2014 || Kitt Peak || Spacewatch || H || align=right data-sort-value="0.56" | 560 m || 
|-id=261 bgcolor=#FA8072
| 472261 ||  || — || February 12, 2011 || Catalina || CSS || — || align=right data-sort-value="0.43" | 430 m || 
|-id=262 bgcolor=#C2E0FF
| 472262 ||  || — || August 18, 2014 || Cerro Tololo-DEC || CTIO-DES || SDO || align=right | 197 km || 
|-id=263 bgcolor=#FFC2E0
| 472263 ||  || — || September 6, 2014 || SONEAR || SONEAR Obs. || APOcritical || align=right data-sort-value="0.78" | 780 m || 
|-id=264 bgcolor=#fefefe
| 472264 ||  || — || March 15, 2010 || Kitt Peak || Spacewatch || — || align=right data-sort-value="0.52" | 520 m || 
|-id=265 bgcolor=#C7FF8F
| 472265 ||  || — || September 19, 2014 || Haleakala || Pan-STARRS || centaur || align=right | 25 km || 
|-id=266 bgcolor=#E9E9E9
| 472266 ||  || — || November 12, 2001 || Socorro || LINEAR || — || align=right | 2.2 km || 
|-id=267 bgcolor=#fefefe
| 472267 ||  || — || October 27, 2006 || Catalina || CSS || H || align=right data-sort-value="0.62" | 620 m || 
|-id=268 bgcolor=#fefefe
| 472268 ||  || — || October 23, 1998 || Kitt Peak || Spacewatch || H || align=right data-sort-value="0.49" | 490 m || 
|-id=269 bgcolor=#E9E9E9
| 472269 ||  || — || February 13, 2008 || Kitt Peak || Spacewatch || — || align=right | 3.7 km || 
|-id=270 bgcolor=#fefefe
| 472270 ||  || — || April 17, 2009 || Catalina || CSS || V || align=right data-sort-value="0.83" | 830 m || 
|-id=271 bgcolor=#C2E0FF
| 472271 ||  || — || October 22, 2014 || Mount Lemmon || Mount Lemmon Survey || other TNO || align=right | 447 km || 
|-id=272 bgcolor=#fefefe
| 472272 ||  || — || November 19, 2009 || Catalina || CSS || H || align=right data-sort-value="0.63" | 630 m || 
|-id=273 bgcolor=#fefefe
| 472273 ||  || — || April 29, 2003 || Kitt Peak || Spacewatch || — || align=right data-sort-value="0.81" | 810 m || 
|-id=274 bgcolor=#fefefe
| 472274 ||  || — || November 4, 2004 || Kitt Peak || Spacewatch || — || align=right data-sort-value="0.79" | 790 m || 
|-id=275 bgcolor=#fefefe
| 472275 ||  || — || October 16, 2009 || Mount Lemmon || Mount Lemmon Survey || H || align=right data-sort-value="0.82" | 820 m || 
|-id=276 bgcolor=#E9E9E9
| 472276 ||  || — || December 30, 2005 || Mount Lemmon || Mount Lemmon Survey || — || align=right | 3.1 km || 
|-id=277 bgcolor=#E9E9E9
| 472277 ||  || — || January 8, 2003 || Socorro || LINEAR || (5) || align=right data-sort-value="0.78" | 780 m || 
|-id=278 bgcolor=#E9E9E9
| 472278 ||  || — || November 25, 2006 || Mount Lemmon || Mount Lemmon Survey || — || align=right | 1.9 km || 
|-id=279 bgcolor=#E9E9E9
| 472279 ||  || — || November 28, 2010 || Mount Lemmon || Mount Lemmon Survey || — || align=right | 2.9 km || 
|-id=280 bgcolor=#fefefe
| 472280 ||  || — || January 1, 2009 || Kitt Peak || Spacewatch || — || align=right data-sort-value="0.77" | 770 m || 
|-id=281 bgcolor=#E9E9E9
| 472281 ||  || — || April 24, 2003 || Kitt Peak || Spacewatch || — || align=right | 3.0 km || 
|-id=282 bgcolor=#d6d6d6
| 472282 ||  || — || May 5, 2010 || WISE || WISE || — || align=right | 3.8 km || 
|-id=283 bgcolor=#fefefe
| 472283 ||  || — || September 11, 2010 || Kitt Peak || Spacewatch || V || align=right data-sort-value="0.67" | 670 m || 
|-id=284 bgcolor=#fefefe
| 472284 ||  || — || March 3, 2005 || Catalina || CSS || — || align=right data-sort-value="0.63" | 630 m || 
|-id=285 bgcolor=#fefefe
| 472285 ||  || — || November 15, 2001 || Kitt Peak || Spacewatch || — || align=right data-sort-value="0.59" | 590 m || 
|-id=286 bgcolor=#E9E9E9
| 472286 ||  || — || February 29, 2012 || Kitt Peak || Spacewatch || — || align=right data-sort-value="0.91" | 910 m || 
|-id=287 bgcolor=#fefefe
| 472287 ||  || — || May 14, 2013 || Siding Spring || SSS || H || align=right data-sort-value="0.91" | 910 m || 
|-id=288 bgcolor=#fefefe
| 472288 ||  || — || October 15, 2006 || Kitt Peak || Spacewatch || H || align=right data-sort-value="0.65" | 650 m || 
|-id=289 bgcolor=#fefefe
| 472289 ||  || — || October 11, 2007 || Kitt Peak || Spacewatch || — || align=right data-sort-value="0.71" | 710 m || 
|-id=290 bgcolor=#fefefe
| 472290 ||  || — || October 19, 2006 || Mount Lemmon || Mount Lemmon Survey || — || align=right | 1.1 km || 
|-id=291 bgcolor=#d6d6d6
| 472291 ||  || — || January 16, 2005 || Kitt Peak || Spacewatch || — || align=right | 3.6 km || 
|-id=292 bgcolor=#d6d6d6
| 472292 ||  || — || April 30, 2010 || WISE || WISE || — || align=right | 2.4 km || 
|-id=293 bgcolor=#d6d6d6
| 472293 ||  || — || May 9, 2005 || Kitt Peak || Spacewatch || — || align=right | 4.2 km || 
|-id=294 bgcolor=#E9E9E9
| 472294 ||  || — || May 12, 2007 || Mount Lemmon || Mount Lemmon Survey || EUN || align=right | 1.6 km || 
|-id=295 bgcolor=#FA8072
| 472295 ||  || — || June 3, 2003 || Kitt Peak || Spacewatch || H || align=right data-sort-value="0.52" | 520 m || 
|-id=296 bgcolor=#fefefe
| 472296 ||  || — || October 8, 2007 || Catalina || CSS || — || align=right data-sort-value="0.99" | 990 m || 
|-id=297 bgcolor=#fefefe
| 472297 ||  || — || December 19, 2003 || Socorro || LINEAR || — || align=right data-sort-value="0.82" | 820 m || 
|-id=298 bgcolor=#E9E9E9
| 472298 ||  || — || January 13, 2002 || Socorro || LINEAR || — || align=right | 1.9 km || 
|-id=299 bgcolor=#fefefe
| 472299 ||  || — || September 29, 2003 || Socorro || LINEAR || — || align=right | 1.4 km || 
|-id=300 bgcolor=#d6d6d6
| 472300 ||  || — || November 4, 2007 || Kitt Peak || Spacewatch || — || align=right | 4.0 km || 
|}

472301–472400 

|-bgcolor=#E9E9E9
| 472301 ||  || — || November 2, 2013 || Catalina || CSS || — || align=right | 3.0 km || 
|-id=302 bgcolor=#E9E9E9
| 472302 ||  || — || January 8, 2006 || Mount Lemmon || Mount Lemmon Survey || — || align=right | 2.4 km || 
|-id=303 bgcolor=#E9E9E9
| 472303 ||  || — || December 7, 2005 || Kitt Peak || Spacewatch || — || align=right | 1.9 km || 
|-id=304 bgcolor=#d6d6d6
| 472304 ||  || — || October 25, 2008 || Kitt Peak || Spacewatch || — || align=right | 3.7 km || 
|-id=305 bgcolor=#d6d6d6
| 472305 ||  || — || January 18, 2010 || WISE || WISE || — || align=right | 4.4 km || 
|-id=306 bgcolor=#E9E9E9
| 472306 ||  || — || November 11, 2009 || Mount Lemmon || Mount Lemmon Survey || — || align=right | 1.8 km || 
|-id=307 bgcolor=#fefefe
| 472307 ||  || — || October 23, 2006 || Catalina || CSS || H || align=right data-sort-value="0.86" | 860 m || 
|-id=308 bgcolor=#fefefe
| 472308 ||  || — || October 29, 2006 || Catalina || CSS || H || align=right data-sort-value="0.90" | 900 m || 
|-id=309 bgcolor=#fefefe
| 472309 ||  || — || April 18, 2009 || Kitt Peak || Spacewatch || — || align=right data-sort-value="0.74" | 740 m || 
|-id=310 bgcolor=#E9E9E9
| 472310 ||  || — || February 8, 2002 || Kitt Peak || Spacewatch || — || align=right | 1.6 km || 
|-id=311 bgcolor=#fefefe
| 472311 ||  || — || December 18, 2004 || Mount Lemmon || Mount Lemmon Survey || — || align=right | 1.0 km || 
|-id=312 bgcolor=#fefefe
| 472312 ||  || — || July 3, 2005 || Mount Lemmon || Mount Lemmon Survey || — || align=right | 1.0 km || 
|-id=313 bgcolor=#d6d6d6
| 472313 ||  || — || June 20, 2006 || Kitt Peak || Spacewatch || — || align=right | 4.0 km || 
|-id=314 bgcolor=#fefefe
| 472314 ||  || — || January 6, 2010 || Kitt Peak || Spacewatch || H || align=right data-sort-value="0.71" | 710 m || 
|-id=315 bgcolor=#E9E9E9
| 472315 ||  || — || December 5, 2002 || Kitt Peak || Spacewatch || — || align=right | 1.6 km || 
|-id=316 bgcolor=#d6d6d6
| 472316 ||  || — || February 17, 2010 || Catalina || CSS || — || align=right | 2.6 km || 
|-id=317 bgcolor=#FA8072
| 472317 ||  || — || January 9, 2002 || Socorro || LINEAR || H || align=right data-sort-value="0.75" | 750 m || 
|-id=318 bgcolor=#fefefe
| 472318 ||  || — || June 12, 2005 || Kitt Peak || Spacewatch || H || align=right data-sort-value="0.78" | 780 m || 
|-id=319 bgcolor=#fefefe
| 472319 ||  || — || December 11, 2004 || Kitt Peak || Spacewatch || — || align=right data-sort-value="0.95" | 950 m || 
|-id=320 bgcolor=#fefefe
| 472320 ||  || — || December 3, 2004 || Kitt Peak || Spacewatch || — || align=right data-sort-value="0.86" | 860 m || 
|-id=321 bgcolor=#fefefe
| 472321 ||  || — || January 16, 2005 || Catalina || CSS || H || align=right data-sort-value="0.76" | 760 m || 
|-id=322 bgcolor=#fefefe
| 472322 ||  || — || March 13, 2010 || Mount Lemmon || Mount Lemmon Survey || H || align=right data-sort-value="0.55" | 550 m || 
|-id=323 bgcolor=#fefefe
| 472323 ||  || — || March 6, 2008 || Catalina || CSS || — || align=right | 3.4 km || 
|-id=324 bgcolor=#fefefe
| 472324 ||  || — || February 10, 2002 || Socorro || LINEAR || H || align=right data-sort-value="0.82" | 820 m || 
|-id=325 bgcolor=#fefefe
| 472325 ||  || — || October 14, 2007 || Mount Lemmon || Mount Lemmon Survey || — || align=right data-sort-value="0.64" | 640 m || 
|-id=326 bgcolor=#E9E9E9
| 472326 ||  || — || December 8, 2010 || Mount Lemmon || Mount Lemmon Survey || KON || align=right | 2.3 km || 
|-id=327 bgcolor=#fefefe
| 472327 ||  || — || March 2, 2000 || Kitt Peak || Spacewatch || — || align=right data-sort-value="0.81" | 810 m || 
|-id=328 bgcolor=#fefefe
| 472328 ||  || — || October 5, 2005 || Kitt Peak || Spacewatch || — || align=right data-sort-value="0.99" | 990 m || 
|-id=329 bgcolor=#E9E9E9
| 472329 ||  || — || January 30, 2011 || Mount Lemmon || Mount Lemmon Survey || — || align=right data-sort-value="0.96" | 960 m || 
|-id=330 bgcolor=#d6d6d6
| 472330 ||  || — || December 26, 2009 || Kitt Peak || Spacewatch || — || align=right | 4.1 km || 
|-id=331 bgcolor=#E9E9E9
| 472331 ||  || — || August 26, 2008 || Siding Spring || SSS || — || align=right | 1.3 km || 
|-id=332 bgcolor=#fefefe
| 472332 ||  || — || December 19, 2007 || Kitt Peak || Spacewatch || (2076) || align=right data-sort-value="0.93" | 930 m || 
|-id=333 bgcolor=#d6d6d6
| 472333 ||  || — || August 25, 2012 || Catalina || CSS || — || align=right | 4.3 km || 
|-id=334 bgcolor=#E9E9E9
| 472334 ||  || — || September 3, 2005 || Catalina || CSS || — || align=right | 1.6 km || 
|-id=335 bgcolor=#E9E9E9
| 472335 ||  || — || January 5, 2006 || Kitt Peak || Spacewatch || EUN || align=right | 1.2 km || 
|-id=336 bgcolor=#E9E9E9
| 472336 ||  || — || January 18, 2002 || Cima Ekar || ADAS || — || align=right | 2.1 km || 
|-id=337 bgcolor=#E9E9E9
| 472337 ||  || — || May 12, 2007 || Kitt Peak || Spacewatch || — || align=right | 2.3 km || 
|-id=338 bgcolor=#E9E9E9
| 472338 ||  || — || May 21, 2012 || Mount Lemmon || Mount Lemmon Survey || — || align=right | 1.5 km || 
|-id=339 bgcolor=#E9E9E9
| 472339 ||  || — || August 14, 2012 || Kitt Peak || Spacewatch || — || align=right | 1.7 km || 
|-id=340 bgcolor=#E9E9E9
| 472340 ||  || — || March 21, 2007 || Mount Lemmon || Mount Lemmon Survey || — || align=right | 1.5 km || 
|-id=341 bgcolor=#E9E9E9
| 472341 ||  || — || January 9, 2006 || Kitt Peak || Spacewatch || — || align=right | 1.7 km || 
|-id=342 bgcolor=#fefefe
| 472342 ||  || — || April 14, 2005 || Catalina || CSS || — || align=right data-sort-value="0.84" | 840 m || 
|-id=343 bgcolor=#E9E9E9
| 472343 ||  || — || March 29, 2003 || Kitt Peak || Spacewatch || — || align=right data-sort-value="0.96" | 960 m || 
|-id=344 bgcolor=#d6d6d6
| 472344 ||  || — || March 15, 2005 || Mount Lemmon || Mount Lemmon Survey || — || align=right | 3.4 km || 
|-id=345 bgcolor=#fefefe
| 472345 ||  || — || December 14, 2010 || Mount Lemmon || Mount Lemmon Survey || — || align=right data-sort-value="0.91" | 910 m || 
|-id=346 bgcolor=#fefefe
| 472346 ||  || — || January 10, 2008 || Mount Lemmon || Mount Lemmon Survey || NYS || align=right data-sort-value="0.47" | 470 m || 
|-id=347 bgcolor=#fefefe
| 472347 ||  || — || January 2, 2012 || Mount Lemmon || Mount Lemmon Survey || — || align=right data-sort-value="0.69" | 690 m || 
|-id=348 bgcolor=#fefefe
| 472348 ||  || — || October 2, 2010 || Kitt Peak || Spacewatch || — || align=right data-sort-value="0.72" | 720 m || 
|-id=349 bgcolor=#E9E9E9
| 472349 ||  || — || June 14, 2004 || Kitt Peak || Spacewatch || — || align=right | 1.4 km || 
|-id=350 bgcolor=#fefefe
| 472350 ||  || — || July 23, 2010 || WISE || WISE || — || align=right | 2.8 km || 
|-id=351 bgcolor=#fefefe
| 472351 ||  || — || October 8, 2007 || Mount Lemmon || Mount Lemmon Survey || — || align=right data-sort-value="0.75" | 750 m || 
|-id=352 bgcolor=#E9E9E9
| 472352 ||  || — || January 29, 2011 || Kitt Peak || Spacewatch || — || align=right | 1.2 km || 
|-id=353 bgcolor=#d6d6d6
| 472353 ||  || — || March 18, 2004 || Siding Spring || SSS || — || align=right | 4.7 km || 
|-id=354 bgcolor=#E9E9E9
| 472354 ||  || — || September 21, 2008 || Catalina || CSS || — || align=right | 2.2 km || 
|-id=355 bgcolor=#E9E9E9
| 472355 ||  || — || February 16, 2001 || Kitt Peak || Spacewatch || — || align=right | 3.4 km || 
|-id=356 bgcolor=#fefefe
| 472356 ||  || — || February 12, 2004 || Kitt Peak || Spacewatch || H || align=right data-sort-value="0.54" | 540 m || 
|-id=357 bgcolor=#d6d6d6
| 472357 ||  || — || January 30, 2004 || Kitt Peak || Spacewatch || — || align=right | 3.1 km || 
|-id=358 bgcolor=#E9E9E9
| 472358 ||  || — || May 9, 2007 || Kitt Peak || Spacewatch || — || align=right | 1.5 km || 
|-id=359 bgcolor=#d6d6d6
| 472359 ||  || — || January 30, 2010 || WISE || WISE || THB || align=right | 2.3 km || 
|-id=360 bgcolor=#d6d6d6
| 472360 ||  || — || October 26, 2008 || Kitt Peak || Spacewatch || — || align=right | 2.8 km || 
|-id=361 bgcolor=#d6d6d6
| 472361 ||  || — || March 11, 2005 || Mount Lemmon || Mount Lemmon Survey || — || align=right | 3.9 km || 
|-id=362 bgcolor=#fefefe
| 472362 ||  || — || October 8, 2005 || Kitt Peak || Spacewatch || — || align=right data-sort-value="0.90" | 900 m || 
|-id=363 bgcolor=#E9E9E9
| 472363 ||  || — || January 28, 2011 || Kitt Peak || Spacewatch || EUN || align=right | 1.3 km || 
|-id=364 bgcolor=#E9E9E9
| 472364 ||  || — || September 15, 2004 || Kitt Peak || Spacewatch || — || align=right | 2.6 km || 
|-id=365 bgcolor=#fefefe
| 472365 ||  || — || November 13, 2010 || Mount Lemmon || Mount Lemmon Survey || V || align=right data-sort-value="0.65" | 650 m || 
|-id=366 bgcolor=#fefefe
| 472366 ||  || — || May 6, 2006 || Mount Lemmon || Mount Lemmon Survey || — || align=right data-sort-value="0.70" | 700 m || 
|-id=367 bgcolor=#E9E9E9
| 472367 ||  || — || December 7, 2013 || Mount Lemmon || Mount Lemmon Survey || EUN || align=right | 1.9 km || 
|-id=368 bgcolor=#d6d6d6
| 472368 ||  || — || January 30, 2009 || Mount Lemmon || Mount Lemmon Survey || — || align=right | 4.4 km || 
|-id=369 bgcolor=#d6d6d6
| 472369 ||  || — || May 29, 2011 || Kitt Peak || Spacewatch || — || align=right | 2.4 km || 
|-id=370 bgcolor=#E9E9E9
| 472370 ||  || — || March 31, 2011 || Mount Lemmon || Mount Lemmon Survey || — || align=right | 2.9 km || 
|-id=371 bgcolor=#fefefe
| 472371 ||  || — || April 17, 2009 || Catalina || CSS || — || align=right data-sort-value="0.84" | 840 m || 
|-id=372 bgcolor=#fefefe
| 472372 ||  || — || November 10, 2010 || Mount Lemmon || Mount Lemmon Survey || (2076) || align=right data-sort-value="0.81" | 810 m || 
|-id=373 bgcolor=#E9E9E9
| 472373 ||  || — || March 25, 2007 || Mount Lemmon || Mount Lemmon Survey || — || align=right | 2.4 km || 
|-id=374 bgcolor=#d6d6d6
| 472374 ||  || — || April 6, 2011 || Mount Lemmon || Mount Lemmon Survey || — || align=right | 2.4 km || 
|-id=375 bgcolor=#fefefe
| 472375 ||  || — || February 9, 2008 || Kitt Peak || Spacewatch || NYS || align=right data-sort-value="0.67" | 670 m || 
|-id=376 bgcolor=#E9E9E9
| 472376 ||  || — || September 18, 2009 || Catalina || CSS || — || align=right | 1.3 km || 
|-id=377 bgcolor=#fefefe
| 472377 ||  || — || July 25, 2008 || Mount Lemmon || Mount Lemmon Survey || H || align=right data-sort-value="0.84" | 840 m || 
|-id=378 bgcolor=#E9E9E9
| 472378 ||  || — || July 3, 2003 || Kitt Peak || Spacewatch || — || align=right | 2.0 km || 
|-id=379 bgcolor=#fefefe
| 472379 ||  || — || January 13, 2005 || Kitt Peak || Spacewatch || — || align=right data-sort-value="0.94" | 940 m || 
|-id=380 bgcolor=#fefefe
| 472380 ||  || — || February 2, 1997 || Kitt Peak || Spacewatch || — || align=right data-sort-value="0.71" | 710 m || 
|-id=381 bgcolor=#E9E9E9
| 472381 ||  || — || September 3, 2008 || Kitt Peak || Spacewatch || AGN || align=right | 1.3 km || 
|-id=382 bgcolor=#fefefe
| 472382 ||  || — || June 15, 2013 || Mount Lemmon || Mount Lemmon Survey || H || align=right data-sort-value="0.71" | 710 m || 
|-id=383 bgcolor=#d6d6d6
| 472383 ||  || — || March 16, 2010 || Kitt Peak || Spacewatch || — || align=right | 3.2 km || 
|-id=384 bgcolor=#E9E9E9
| 472384 ||  || — || January 27, 2006 || Anderson Mesa || LONEOS || — || align=right | 1.9 km || 
|-id=385 bgcolor=#E9E9E9
| 472385 ||  || — || February 23, 2007 || Mount Lemmon || Mount Lemmon Survey || — || align=right | 1.2 km || 
|-id=386 bgcolor=#fefefe
| 472386 ||  || — || February 16, 2004 || Socorro || LINEAR || — || align=right data-sort-value="0.96" | 960 m || 
|-id=387 bgcolor=#E9E9E9
| 472387 ||  || — || February 6, 2010 || WISE || WISE || — || align=right | 1.8 km || 
|-id=388 bgcolor=#fefefe
| 472388 ||  || — || April 1, 2009 || Kitt Peak || Spacewatch || — || align=right data-sort-value="0.65" | 650 m || 
|-id=389 bgcolor=#E9E9E9
| 472389 ||  || — || December 11, 2010 || Mount Lemmon || Mount Lemmon Survey || — || align=right data-sort-value="0.94" | 940 m || 
|-id=390 bgcolor=#E9E9E9
| 472390 ||  || — || January 30, 2010 || WISE || WISE || — || align=right | 2.3 km || 
|-id=391 bgcolor=#fefefe
| 472391 ||  || — || April 20, 2004 || Desert Eagle || W. K. Y. Yeung || — || align=right data-sort-value="0.75" | 750 m || 
|-id=392 bgcolor=#fefefe
| 472392 ||  || — || January 15, 2008 || Mount Lemmon || Mount Lemmon Survey || — || align=right data-sort-value="0.68" | 680 m || 
|-id=393 bgcolor=#fefefe
| 472393 ||  || — || April 1, 2009 || Kitt Peak || Spacewatch || — || align=right data-sort-value="0.72" | 720 m || 
|-id=394 bgcolor=#d6d6d6
| 472394 ||  || — || May 16, 2010 || WISE || WISE || — || align=right | 3.7 km || 
|-id=395 bgcolor=#E9E9E9
| 472395 ||  || — || February 26, 2011 || Mount Lemmon || Mount Lemmon Survey || MIS || align=right | 2.7 km || 
|-id=396 bgcolor=#E9E9E9
| 472396 ||  || — || February 2, 2006 || Kitt Peak || Spacewatch || DOR || align=right | 2.4 km || 
|-id=397 bgcolor=#fefefe
| 472397 ||  || — || March 6, 2008 || Mount Lemmon || Mount Lemmon Survey || — || align=right data-sort-value="0.80" | 800 m || 
|-id=398 bgcolor=#E9E9E9
| 472398 ||  || — || November 23, 1995 || Kitt Peak || Spacewatch || — || align=right | 2.4 km || 
|-id=399 bgcolor=#fefefe
| 472399 ||  || — || March 16, 2005 || Mount Lemmon || Mount Lemmon Survey || — || align=right data-sort-value="0.80" | 800 m || 
|-id=400 bgcolor=#fefefe
| 472400 ||  || — || February 9, 2008 || Mount Lemmon || Mount Lemmon Survey || — || align=right data-sort-value="0.64" | 640 m || 
|}

472401–472500 

|-bgcolor=#fefefe
| 472401 ||  || — || April 6, 2008 || Kitt Peak || Spacewatch || — || align=right data-sort-value="0.88" | 880 m || 
|-id=402 bgcolor=#fefefe
| 472402 ||  || — || February 9, 2008 || Mount Lemmon || Mount Lemmon Survey || — || align=right data-sort-value="0.68" | 680 m || 
|-id=403 bgcolor=#fefefe
| 472403 ||  || — || October 31, 2007 || Mount Lemmon || Mount Lemmon Survey || — || align=right data-sort-value="0.59" | 590 m || 
|-id=404 bgcolor=#d6d6d6
| 472404 ||  || — || September 28, 2008 || Mount Lemmon || Mount Lemmon Survey || — || align=right | 2.2 km || 
|-id=405 bgcolor=#fefefe
| 472405 ||  || — || January 17, 2005 || Kitt Peak || Spacewatch || — || align=right data-sort-value="0.95" | 950 m || 
|-id=406 bgcolor=#fefefe
| 472406 ||  || — || October 13, 2010 || Mount Lemmon || Mount Lemmon Survey || — || align=right data-sort-value="0.78" | 780 m || 
|-id=407 bgcolor=#fefefe
| 472407 ||  || — || February 26, 2012 || Kitt Peak || Spacewatch || — || align=right data-sort-value="0.64" | 640 m || 
|-id=408 bgcolor=#E9E9E9
| 472408 ||  || — || February 21, 2007 || Kitt Peak || Spacewatch || — || align=right data-sort-value="0.76" | 760 m || 
|-id=409 bgcolor=#fefefe
| 472409 ||  || — || December 30, 2007 || Kitt Peak || Spacewatch || — || align=right data-sort-value="0.80" | 800 m || 
|-id=410 bgcolor=#fefefe
| 472410 ||  || — || December 1, 2003 || Kitt Peak || Spacewatch || — || align=right data-sort-value="0.77" | 770 m || 
|-id=411 bgcolor=#d6d6d6
| 472411 ||  || — || February 14, 2010 || Mount Lemmon || Mount Lemmon Survey || — || align=right | 2.4 km || 
|-id=412 bgcolor=#E9E9E9
| 472412 ||  || — || September 3, 2008 || Kitt Peak || Spacewatch || — || align=right | 1.3 km || 
|-id=413 bgcolor=#fefefe
| 472413 ||  || — || March 4, 2008 || Kitt Peak || Spacewatch || — || align=right data-sort-value="0.87" | 870 m || 
|-id=414 bgcolor=#fefefe
| 472414 ||  || — || December 9, 2010 || Kitt Peak || Spacewatch || — || align=right | 1.1 km || 
|-id=415 bgcolor=#fefefe
| 472415 ||  || — || December 21, 2003 || Kitt Peak || Spacewatch || — || align=right data-sort-value="0.91" | 910 m || 
|-id=416 bgcolor=#fefefe
| 472416 ||  || — || February 9, 2005 || Mount Lemmon || Mount Lemmon Survey || — || align=right data-sort-value="0.84" | 840 m || 
|-id=417 bgcolor=#E9E9E9
| 472417 ||  || — || January 7, 2006 || Mount Lemmon || Mount Lemmon Survey || — || align=right | 2.5 km || 
|-id=418 bgcolor=#E9E9E9
| 472418 ||  || — || September 12, 2004 || Kitt Peak || Spacewatch || — || align=right data-sort-value="0.92" | 920 m || 
|-id=419 bgcolor=#fefefe
| 472419 ||  || — || November 21, 2006 || Mount Lemmon || Mount Lemmon Survey || — || align=right | 1.0 km || 
|-id=420 bgcolor=#E9E9E9
| 472420 ||  || — || December 10, 2005 || Kitt Peak || Spacewatch || — || align=right | 1.0 km || 
|-id=421 bgcolor=#fefefe
| 472421 ||  || — || November 2, 2007 || Kitt Peak || Spacewatch || — || align=right data-sort-value="0.63" | 630 m || 
|-id=422 bgcolor=#E9E9E9
| 472422 ||  || — || November 8, 2009 || Kitt Peak || Spacewatch || — || align=right | 1.7 km || 
|-id=423 bgcolor=#E9E9E9
| 472423 ||  || — || December 17, 2009 || Mount Lemmon || Mount Lemmon Survey || — || align=right | 2.0 km || 
|-id=424 bgcolor=#d6d6d6
| 472424 ||  || — || October 8, 2012 || Mount Lemmon || Mount Lemmon Survey || EOS || align=right | 2.1 km || 
|-id=425 bgcolor=#E9E9E9
| 472425 ||  || — || September 5, 2013 || Catalina || CSS || — || align=right | 1.9 km || 
|-id=426 bgcolor=#d6d6d6
| 472426 ||  || — || March 15, 2004 || Kitt Peak || Spacewatch || LIX || align=right | 3.6 km || 
|-id=427 bgcolor=#E9E9E9
| 472427 ||  || — || March 13, 2007 || Kitt Peak || Spacewatch || — || align=right | 1.6 km || 
|-id=428 bgcolor=#d6d6d6
| 472428 ||  || — || March 16, 2010 || Mount Lemmon || Mount Lemmon Survey || — || align=right | 3.1 km || 
|-id=429 bgcolor=#E9E9E9
| 472429 ||  || — || March 9, 1997 || Kitt Peak || Spacewatch || — || align=right | 1.8 km || 
|-id=430 bgcolor=#E9E9E9
| 472430 ||  || — || February 10, 2002 || Socorro || LINEAR || — || align=right | 1.2 km || 
|-id=431 bgcolor=#fefefe
| 472431 ||  || — || December 19, 2003 || Socorro || LINEAR || — || align=right data-sort-value="0.91" | 910 m || 
|-id=432 bgcolor=#fefefe
| 472432 ||  || — || February 13, 2004 || Kitt Peak || Spacewatch || H || align=right data-sort-value="0.61" | 610 m || 
|-id=433 bgcolor=#E9E9E9
| 472433 ||  || — || April 13, 2011 || Catalina || CSS || — || align=right | 1.1 km || 
|-id=434 bgcolor=#fefefe
| 472434 ||  || — || February 13, 2004 || Kitt Peak || Spacewatch || — || align=right data-sort-value="0.72" | 720 m || 
|-id=435 bgcolor=#fefefe
| 472435 ||  || — || April 5, 2008 || Catalina || CSS || V || align=right data-sort-value="0.89" | 890 m || 
|-id=436 bgcolor=#E9E9E9
| 472436 ||  || — || January 30, 2006 || Kitt Peak || Spacewatch || EUN || align=right | 1.3 km || 
|-id=437 bgcolor=#d6d6d6
| 472437 ||  || — || May 14, 2005 || Kitt Peak || Spacewatch || — || align=right | 3.3 km || 
|-id=438 bgcolor=#d6d6d6
| 472438 ||  || — || July 3, 2005 || Mount Lemmon || Mount Lemmon Survey || — || align=right | 3.3 km || 
|-id=439 bgcolor=#fefefe
| 472439 ||  || — || April 21, 2012 || Mount Lemmon || Mount Lemmon Survey || — || align=right data-sort-value="0.63" | 630 m || 
|-id=440 bgcolor=#E9E9E9
| 472440 ||  || — || September 6, 2008 || Catalina || CSS || — || align=right | 2.8 km || 
|-id=441 bgcolor=#d6d6d6
| 472441 ||  || — || November 22, 2008 || Kitt Peak || Spacewatch || — || align=right | 3.9 km || 
|-id=442 bgcolor=#fefefe
| 472442 ||  || — || September 18, 2006 || Catalina || CSS || — || align=right data-sort-value="0.98" | 980 m || 
|-id=443 bgcolor=#fefefe
| 472443 ||  || — || December 26, 2006 || Kitt Peak || Spacewatch || H || align=right data-sort-value="0.46" | 460 m || 
|-id=444 bgcolor=#d6d6d6
| 472444 ||  || — || June 5, 2011 || Mount Lemmon || Mount Lemmon Survey || — || align=right | 2.6 km || 
|-id=445 bgcolor=#d6d6d6
| 472445 ||  || — || January 7, 2010 || Mount Lemmon || Mount Lemmon Survey || KOR || align=right | 1.2 km || 
|-id=446 bgcolor=#E9E9E9
| 472446 ||  || — || September 6, 2008 || Mount Lemmon || Mount Lemmon Survey || — || align=right | 1.1 km || 
|-id=447 bgcolor=#E9E9E9
| 472447 ||  || — || March 19, 2007 || Mount Lemmon || Mount Lemmon Survey || — || align=right | 1.4 km || 
|-id=448 bgcolor=#fefefe
| 472448 ||  || — || September 19, 2009 || Mount Lemmon || Mount Lemmon Survey || — || align=right data-sort-value="0.82" | 820 m || 
|-id=449 bgcolor=#d6d6d6
| 472449 ||  || — || December 29, 2003 || Kitt Peak || Spacewatch || — || align=right | 3.0 km || 
|-id=450 bgcolor=#fefefe
| 472450 ||  || — || January 18, 2008 || Kitt Peak || Spacewatch || V || align=right data-sort-value="0.72" | 720 m || 
|-id=451 bgcolor=#fefefe
| 472451 ||  || — || November 6, 2010 || Mount Lemmon || Mount Lemmon Survey || — || align=right data-sort-value="0.75" | 750 m || 
|-id=452 bgcolor=#d6d6d6
| 472452 ||  || — || December 25, 2009 || Kitt Peak || Spacewatch || — || align=right | 3.6 km || 
|-id=453 bgcolor=#fefefe
| 472453 ||  || — || July 3, 2005 || Mount Lemmon || Mount Lemmon Survey || — || align=right data-sort-value="0.74" | 740 m || 
|-id=454 bgcolor=#fefefe
| 472454 ||  || — || March 24, 2012 || Kitt Peak || Spacewatch || — || align=right data-sort-value="0.65" | 650 m || 
|-id=455 bgcolor=#fefefe
| 472455 ||  || — || December 17, 2007 || Kitt Peak || Spacewatch || — || align=right data-sort-value="0.91" | 910 m || 
|-id=456 bgcolor=#fefefe
| 472456 ||  || — || November 22, 2006 || Kitt Peak || Spacewatch || — || align=right data-sort-value="0.78" | 780 m || 
|-id=457 bgcolor=#fefefe
| 472457 ||  || — || October 17, 2010 || Mount Lemmon || Mount Lemmon Survey || — || align=right data-sort-value="0.65" | 650 m || 
|-id=458 bgcolor=#E9E9E9
| 472458 ||  || — || April 30, 2012 || Mount Lemmon || Mount Lemmon Survey || EUN || align=right | 1.4 km || 
|-id=459 bgcolor=#E9E9E9
| 472459 ||  || — || February 21, 2007 || Mount Lemmon || Mount Lemmon Survey || — || align=right data-sort-value="0.84" | 840 m || 
|-id=460 bgcolor=#fefefe
| 472460 ||  || — || April 13, 2008 || Kitt Peak || Spacewatch || MAS || align=right data-sort-value="0.65" | 650 m || 
|-id=461 bgcolor=#fefefe
| 472461 ||  || — || April 21, 2006 || Kitt Peak || Spacewatch || — || align=right data-sort-value="0.60" | 600 m || 
|-id=462 bgcolor=#d6d6d6
| 472462 ||  || — || February 17, 2010 || Mount Lemmon || Mount Lemmon Survey || — || align=right | 2.2 km || 
|-id=463 bgcolor=#d6d6d6
| 472463 ||  || — || April 23, 2011 || Kitt Peak || Spacewatch || — || align=right | 2.4 km || 
|-id=464 bgcolor=#E9E9E9
| 472464 ||  || — || March 9, 2011 || Mount Lemmon || Mount Lemmon Survey || — || align=right data-sort-value="0.96" | 960 m || 
|-id=465 bgcolor=#E9E9E9
| 472465 ||  || — || October 22, 2009 || Mount Lemmon || Mount Lemmon Survey || (5) || align=right data-sort-value="0.71" | 710 m || 
|-id=466 bgcolor=#d6d6d6
| 472466 ||  || — || February 14, 2010 || Mount Lemmon || Mount Lemmon Survey || — || align=right | 2.0 km || 
|-id=467 bgcolor=#fefefe
| 472467 ||  || — || February 5, 2011 || Mount Lemmon || Mount Lemmon Survey || — || align=right data-sort-value="0.87" | 870 m || 
|-id=468 bgcolor=#d6d6d6
| 472468 ||  || — || July 2, 2011 || Mount Lemmon || Mount Lemmon Survey || — || align=right | 2.5 km || 
|-id=469 bgcolor=#E9E9E9
| 472469 ||  || — || March 11, 2007 || Kitt Peak || Spacewatch || BRG || align=right | 1.4 km || 
|-id=470 bgcolor=#fefefe
| 472470 ||  || — || September 15, 2009 || Kitt Peak || Spacewatch || — || align=right data-sort-value="0.91" | 910 m || 
|-id=471 bgcolor=#E9E9E9
| 472471 ||  || — || January 22, 2006 || Mount Lemmon || Mount Lemmon Survey || WIT || align=right data-sort-value="0.89" | 890 m || 
|-id=472 bgcolor=#fefefe
| 472472 ||  || — || February 7, 2008 || Kitt Peak || Spacewatch || — || align=right data-sort-value="0.83" | 830 m || 
|-id=473 bgcolor=#E9E9E9
| 472473 ||  || — || September 6, 2008 || Kitt Peak || Spacewatch || — || align=right | 1.2 km || 
|-id=474 bgcolor=#d6d6d6
| 472474 ||  || — || January 20, 2015 || Kitt Peak || Spacewatch || — || align=right | 2.9 km || 
|-id=475 bgcolor=#E9E9E9
| 472475 ||  || — || June 14, 2012 || Mount Lemmon || Mount Lemmon Survey || — || align=right | 1.3 km || 
|-id=476 bgcolor=#fefefe
| 472476 ||  || — || September 17, 2006 || Catalina || CSS || — || align=right data-sort-value="0.93" | 930 m || 
|-id=477 bgcolor=#fefefe
| 472477 ||  || — || December 30, 2007 || Kitt Peak || Spacewatch || — || align=right data-sort-value="0.79" | 790 m || 
|-id=478 bgcolor=#d6d6d6
| 472478 ||  || — || March 21, 2010 || Mount Lemmon || Mount Lemmon Survey || — || align=right | 2.1 km || 
|-id=479 bgcolor=#E9E9E9
| 472479 ||  || — || February 13, 2011 || Mount Lemmon || Mount Lemmon Survey || — || align=right | 1.4 km || 
|-id=480 bgcolor=#fefefe
| 472480 ||  || — || January 11, 2008 || Kitt Peak || Spacewatch || — || align=right data-sort-value="0.73" | 730 m || 
|-id=481 bgcolor=#fefefe
| 472481 ||  || — || March 10, 2008 || Kitt Peak || Spacewatch || — || align=right data-sort-value="0.78" | 780 m || 
|-id=482 bgcolor=#E9E9E9
| 472482 ||  || — || March 27, 2011 || Mount Lemmon || Mount Lemmon Survey || — || align=right | 2.7 km || 
|-id=483 bgcolor=#E9E9E9
| 472483 ||  || — || November 30, 2005 || Kitt Peak || Spacewatch || — || align=right | 1.5 km || 
|-id=484 bgcolor=#E9E9E9
| 472484 ||  || — || October 29, 2005 || Catalina || CSS || — || align=right | 1.3 km || 
|-id=485 bgcolor=#FA8072
| 472485 ||  || — || July 1, 2008 || Kitt Peak || Spacewatch || H || align=right data-sort-value="0.57" | 570 m || 
|-id=486 bgcolor=#E9E9E9
| 472486 ||  || — || January 14, 2002 || Kitt Peak || Spacewatch || — || align=right | 1.5 km || 
|-id=487 bgcolor=#fefefe
| 472487 ||  || — || July 11, 2005 || Kitt Peak || Spacewatch || NYS || align=right data-sort-value="0.64" | 640 m || 
|-id=488 bgcolor=#fefefe
| 472488 ||  || — || March 9, 2008 || Kitt Peak || Spacewatch || — || align=right data-sort-value="0.95" | 950 m || 
|-id=489 bgcolor=#fefefe
| 472489 ||  || — || December 14, 2010 || Mount Lemmon || Mount Lemmon Survey || — || align=right data-sort-value="0.79" | 790 m || 
|-id=490 bgcolor=#d6d6d6
| 472490 ||  || — || February 12, 2004 || Kitt Peak || Spacewatch || — || align=right | 3.1 km || 
|-id=491 bgcolor=#fefefe
| 472491 ||  || — || September 1, 2005 || Kitt Peak || Spacewatch || — || align=right | 1.0 km || 
|-id=492 bgcolor=#fefefe
| 472492 ||  || — || December 15, 2004 || Kitt Peak || Spacewatch || — || align=right data-sort-value="0.88" | 880 m || 
|-id=493 bgcolor=#fefefe
| 472493 ||  || — || September 25, 2006 || Kitt Peak || Spacewatch || — || align=right data-sort-value="0.90" | 900 m || 
|-id=494 bgcolor=#fefefe
| 472494 ||  || — || March 18, 2004 || Kitt Peak || Spacewatch || — || align=right data-sort-value="0.91" | 910 m || 
|-id=495 bgcolor=#E9E9E9
| 472495 ||  || — || August 26, 2012 || Kitt Peak || Spacewatch || EUN || align=right | 1.2 km || 
|-id=496 bgcolor=#fefefe
| 472496 ||  || — || April 4, 2008 || Catalina || CSS || — || align=right data-sort-value="0.96" | 960 m || 
|-id=497 bgcolor=#d6d6d6
| 472497 ||  || — || March 14, 2004 || Socorro || LINEAR || — || align=right | 3.5 km || 
|-id=498 bgcolor=#d6d6d6
| 472498 ||  || — || January 20, 2010 || WISE || WISE || — || align=right | 3.7 km || 
|-id=499 bgcolor=#fefefe
| 472499 ||  || — || October 29, 2010 || Mount Lemmon || Mount Lemmon Survey || — || align=right data-sort-value="0.75" | 750 m || 
|-id=500 bgcolor=#fefefe
| 472500 ||  || — || March 17, 1996 || Kitt Peak || Spacewatch || — || align=right data-sort-value="0.97" | 970 m || 
|}

472501–472600 

|-bgcolor=#d6d6d6
| 472501 ||  || — || October 5, 2007 || Kitt Peak || Spacewatch || — || align=right | 3.1 km || 
|-id=502 bgcolor=#d6d6d6
| 472502 ||  || — || March 12, 2010 || Mount Lemmon || Mount Lemmon Survey || — || align=right | 2.6 km || 
|-id=503 bgcolor=#fefefe
| 472503 ||  || — || July 12, 2005 || Mount Lemmon || Mount Lemmon Survey || NYS || align=right data-sort-value="0.49" | 490 m || 
|-id=504 bgcolor=#fefefe
| 472504 ||  || — || February 23, 2011 || Catalina || CSS || — || align=right | 1.0 km || 
|-id=505 bgcolor=#fefefe
| 472505 ||  || — || March 17, 2004 || Kitt Peak || Spacewatch || — || align=right data-sort-value="0.91" | 910 m || 
|-id=506 bgcolor=#E9E9E9
| 472506 ||  || — || February 27, 2006 || Kitt Peak || Spacewatch || — || align=right | 2.1 km || 
|-id=507 bgcolor=#fefefe
| 472507 ||  || — || April 6, 2008 || Kitt Peak || Spacewatch || — || align=right data-sort-value="0.86" | 860 m || 
|-id=508 bgcolor=#E9E9E9
| 472508 ||  || — || October 19, 1995 || Kitt Peak || Spacewatch || — || align=right | 2.3 km || 
|-id=509 bgcolor=#fefefe
| 472509 ||  || — || May 13, 2004 || Kitt Peak || Spacewatch || — || align=right data-sort-value="0.85" | 850 m || 
|-id=510 bgcolor=#fefefe
| 472510 ||  || — || August 15, 2009 || Kitt Peak || Spacewatch || — || align=right data-sort-value="0.94" | 940 m || 
|-id=511 bgcolor=#E9E9E9
| 472511 ||  || — || February 2, 2006 || Kitt Peak || Spacewatch || — || align=right | 1.4 km || 
|-id=512 bgcolor=#E9E9E9
| 472512 ||  || — || March 12, 2007 || Catalina || CSS || — || align=right | 1.2 km || 
|-id=513 bgcolor=#d6d6d6
| 472513 ||  || — || March 16, 2005 || Catalina || CSS || — || align=right | 2.9 km || 
|-id=514 bgcolor=#fefefe
| 472514 ||  || — || March 10, 2005 || Kitt Peak || Spacewatch || — || align=right data-sort-value="0.62" | 620 m || 
|-id=515 bgcolor=#E9E9E9
| 472515 ||  || — || November 16, 2009 || Mount Lemmon || Mount Lemmon Survey || EUN || align=right | 1.3 km || 
|-id=516 bgcolor=#fefefe
| 472516 ||  || — || April 8, 2008 || Mount Lemmon || Mount Lemmon Survey || — || align=right data-sort-value="0.73" | 730 m || 
|-id=517 bgcolor=#E9E9E9
| 472517 ||  || — || February 17, 2001 || Kitt Peak || Spacewatch || — || align=right | 2.1 km || 
|-id=518 bgcolor=#fefefe
| 472518 ||  || — || February 10, 2002 || Socorro || LINEAR || — || align=right data-sort-value="0.69" | 690 m || 
|-id=519 bgcolor=#fefefe
| 472519 ||  || — || March 28, 2008 || Kitt Peak || Spacewatch || V || align=right data-sort-value="0.56" | 560 m || 
|-id=520 bgcolor=#fefefe
| 472520 ||  || — || January 13, 2011 || Kitt Peak || Spacewatch || — || align=right data-sort-value="0.94" | 940 m || 
|-id=521 bgcolor=#fefefe
| 472521 ||  || — || January 26, 2001 || Kitt Peak || Spacewatch || — || align=right data-sort-value="0.94" | 940 m || 
|-id=522 bgcolor=#E9E9E9
| 472522 ||  || — || September 6, 2008 || Kitt Peak || Spacewatch || — || align=right | 1.4 km || 
|-id=523 bgcolor=#fefefe
| 472523 ||  || — || August 28, 2005 || Kitt Peak || Spacewatch || — || align=right | 1.0 km || 
|-id=524 bgcolor=#fefefe
| 472524 ||  || — || February 10, 2011 || Mount Lemmon || Mount Lemmon Survey || — || align=right data-sort-value="0.99" | 990 m || 
|-id=525 bgcolor=#E9E9E9
| 472525 ||  || — || April 11, 2003 || Kitt Peak || Spacewatch || (5) || align=right data-sort-value="0.78" | 780 m || 
|-id=526 bgcolor=#fefefe
| 472526 ||  || — || December 4, 2007 || Mount Lemmon || Mount Lemmon Survey || — || align=right data-sort-value="0.67" | 670 m || 
|-id=527 bgcolor=#fefefe
| 472527 ||  || — || August 16, 2009 || Kitt Peak || Spacewatch || — || align=right data-sort-value="0.87" | 870 m || 
|-id=528 bgcolor=#d6d6d6
| 472528 ||  || — || March 17, 2004 || Kitt Peak || Spacewatch || — || align=right | 3.2 km || 
|-id=529 bgcolor=#d6d6d6
| 472529 ||  || — || March 12, 2010 || Mount Lemmon || Mount Lemmon Survey || — || align=right | 3.3 km || 
|-id=530 bgcolor=#E9E9E9
| 472530 ||  || — || December 3, 2008 || Mount Lemmon || Mount Lemmon Survey || — || align=right | 3.0 km || 
|-id=531 bgcolor=#E9E9E9
| 472531 ||  || — || February 10, 2011 || Catalina || CSS || — || align=right | 1.4 km || 
|-id=532 bgcolor=#E9E9E9
| 472532 ||  || — || January 11, 2002 || Kitt Peak || Spacewatch || — || align=right | 1.6 km || 
|-id=533 bgcolor=#E9E9E9
| 472533 ||  || — || February 27, 2006 || Kitt Peak || Spacewatch || — || align=right | 2.9 km || 
|-id=534 bgcolor=#fefefe
| 472534 ||  || — || February 14, 2008 || Mount Lemmon || Mount Lemmon Survey || — || align=right data-sort-value="0.79" | 790 m || 
|-id=535 bgcolor=#fefefe
| 472535 ||  || — || May 13, 2005 || Mount Lemmon || Mount Lemmon Survey || — || align=right data-sort-value="0.89" | 890 m || 
|-id=536 bgcolor=#d6d6d6
| 472536 ||  || — || April 6, 2005 || Catalina || CSS || — || align=right | 2.2 km || 
|-id=537 bgcolor=#fefefe
| 472537 ||  || — || April 17, 2005 || Kitt Peak || Spacewatch || (2076) || align=right data-sort-value="0.82" | 820 m || 
|-id=538 bgcolor=#fefefe
| 472538 ||  || — || December 3, 2010 || Mount Lemmon || Mount Lemmon Survey || — || align=right data-sort-value="0.70" | 700 m || 
|-id=539 bgcolor=#fefefe
| 472539 ||  || — || May 21, 2006 || Kitt Peak || Spacewatch || — || align=right data-sort-value="0.60" | 600 m || 
|-id=540 bgcolor=#fefefe
| 472540 ||  || — || October 7, 2013 || Mount Lemmon || Mount Lemmon Survey || — || align=right data-sort-value="0.94" | 940 m || 
|-id=541 bgcolor=#fefefe
| 472541 ||  || — || March 28, 2012 || Mount Lemmon || Mount Lemmon Survey || — || align=right data-sort-value="0.73" | 730 m || 
|-id=542 bgcolor=#fefefe
| 472542 ||  || — || March 2, 2008 || Kitt Peak || Spacewatch || V || align=right data-sort-value="0.64" | 640 m || 
|-id=543 bgcolor=#E9E9E9
| 472543 ||  || — || February 26, 2007 || Mount Lemmon || Mount Lemmon Survey || — || align=right data-sort-value="0.90" | 900 m || 
|-id=544 bgcolor=#fefefe
| 472544 ||  || — || December 1, 2003 || Kitt Peak || Spacewatch || V || align=right data-sort-value="0.67" | 670 m || 
|-id=545 bgcolor=#E9E9E9
| 472545 ||  || — || May 10, 2007 || Kitt Peak || Spacewatch || — || align=right | 1.4 km || 
|-id=546 bgcolor=#E9E9E9
| 472546 ||  || — || March 26, 2011 || Mount Lemmon || Mount Lemmon Survey || EUN || align=right | 1.1 km || 
|-id=547 bgcolor=#E9E9E9
| 472547 ||  || — || January 22, 2006 || Mount Lemmon || Mount Lemmon Survey || — || align=right | 2.0 km || 
|-id=548 bgcolor=#fefefe
| 472548 ||  || — || October 23, 2001 || Kitt Peak || Spacewatch || NYS || align=right data-sort-value="0.66" | 660 m || 
|-id=549 bgcolor=#E9E9E9
| 472549 ||  || — || April 5, 2003 || Kitt Peak || Spacewatch || — || align=right data-sort-value="0.87" | 870 m || 
|-id=550 bgcolor=#fefefe
| 472550 ||  || — || April 26, 2000 || Kitt Peak || Spacewatch || — || align=right data-sort-value="0.60" | 600 m || 
|-id=551 bgcolor=#E9E9E9
| 472551 ||  || — || March 17, 2007 || Anderson Mesa || LONEOS || — || align=right | 1.4 km || 
|-id=552 bgcolor=#fefefe
| 472552 ||  || — || January 17, 2007 || Kitt Peak || Spacewatch || — || align=right data-sort-value="0.83" | 830 m || 
|-id=553 bgcolor=#d6d6d6
| 472553 ||  || — || April 25, 2006 || Kitt Peak || Spacewatch || — || align=right | 2.8 km || 
|-id=554 bgcolor=#d6d6d6
| 472554 ||  || — || January 16, 2009 || Kitt Peak || Spacewatch || — || align=right | 3.6 km || 
|-id=555 bgcolor=#E9E9E9
| 472555 ||  || — || March 5, 2011 || Mount Lemmon || Mount Lemmon Survey || — || align=right | 1.4 km || 
|-id=556 bgcolor=#E9E9E9
| 472556 ||  || — || October 25, 2005 || Mount Lemmon || Mount Lemmon Survey || — || align=right | 1.0 km || 
|-id=557 bgcolor=#E9E9E9
| 472557 ||  || — || January 8, 2010 || Kitt Peak || Spacewatch || — || align=right | 3.2 km || 
|-id=558 bgcolor=#E9E9E9
| 472558 ||  || — || October 10, 2004 || Kitt Peak || Spacewatch || — || align=right | 1.5 km || 
|-id=559 bgcolor=#d6d6d6
| 472559 ||  || — || December 29, 2008 || Mount Lemmon || Mount Lemmon Survey || EOS || align=right | 1.7 km || 
|-id=560 bgcolor=#d6d6d6
| 472560 ||  || — || February 22, 2004 || Kitt Peak || Spacewatch || — || align=right | 2.7 km || 
|-id=561 bgcolor=#fefefe
| 472561 ||  || — || February 11, 2008 || Mount Lemmon || Mount Lemmon Survey || — || align=right data-sort-value="0.85" | 850 m || 
|-id=562 bgcolor=#fefefe
| 472562 ||  || — || January 10, 2011 || Kitt Peak || Spacewatch || — || align=right data-sort-value="0.85" | 850 m || 
|-id=563 bgcolor=#E9E9E9
| 472563 ||  || — || October 1, 2008 || Mount Lemmon || Mount Lemmon Survey || — || align=right | 1.8 km || 
|-id=564 bgcolor=#fefefe
| 472564 ||  || — || February 29, 2008 || Kitt Peak || Spacewatch || — || align=right data-sort-value="0.66" | 660 m || 
|-id=565 bgcolor=#fefefe
| 472565 ||  || — || February 26, 2008 || Mount Lemmon || Mount Lemmon Survey || — || align=right data-sort-value="0.56" | 560 m || 
|-id=566 bgcolor=#fefefe
| 472566 ||  || — || March 28, 2008 || Mount Lemmon || Mount Lemmon Survey || — || align=right data-sort-value="0.65" | 650 m || 
|-id=567 bgcolor=#E9E9E9
| 472567 ||  || — || September 29, 2008 || Mount Lemmon || Mount Lemmon Survey || — || align=right | 1.5 km || 
|-id=568 bgcolor=#d6d6d6
| 472568 ||  || — || January 3, 2009 || Mount Lemmon || Mount Lemmon Survey || — || align=right | 2.6 km || 
|-id=569 bgcolor=#d6d6d6
| 472569 ||  || — || October 6, 2008 || Mount Lemmon || Mount Lemmon Survey || — || align=right | 2.1 km || 
|-id=570 bgcolor=#d6d6d6
| 472570 ||  || — || June 20, 2010 || WISE || WISE || EOS || align=right | 3.5 km || 
|-id=571 bgcolor=#fefefe
| 472571 ||  || — || January 15, 2011 || Mount Lemmon || Mount Lemmon Survey || — || align=right data-sort-value="0.82" | 820 m || 
|-id=572 bgcolor=#E9E9E9
| 472572 ||  || — || September 17, 2003 || Kitt Peak || Spacewatch || — || align=right | 2.3 km || 
|-id=573 bgcolor=#fefefe
| 472573 ||  || — || November 19, 2007 || Mount Lemmon || Mount Lemmon Survey || — || align=right data-sort-value="0.86" | 860 m || 
|-id=574 bgcolor=#d6d6d6
| 472574 ||  || — || November 7, 2012 || Catalina || CSS || — || align=right | 2.6 km || 
|-id=575 bgcolor=#E9E9E9
| 472575 ||  || — || March 23, 1995 || Kitt Peak || Spacewatch || — || align=right | 1.3 km || 
|-id=576 bgcolor=#fefefe
| 472576 ||  || — || October 22, 2006 || Kitt Peak || Spacewatch || — || align=right data-sort-value="0.72" | 720 m || 
|-id=577 bgcolor=#d6d6d6
| 472577 ||  || — || May 8, 2005 || Kitt Peak || Spacewatch || — || align=right | 3.1 km || 
|-id=578 bgcolor=#fefefe
| 472578 ||  || — || September 27, 2006 || Mount Lemmon || Mount Lemmon Survey || — || align=right data-sort-value="0.82" | 820 m || 
|-id=579 bgcolor=#d6d6d6
| 472579 ||  || — || March 18, 2004 || Socorro || LINEAR || (1118) || align=right | 4.7 km || 
|-id=580 bgcolor=#fefefe
| 472580 ||  || — || December 1, 2003 || Kitt Peak || Spacewatch || — || align=right data-sort-value="0.85" | 850 m || 
|-id=581 bgcolor=#d6d6d6
| 472581 ||  || — || January 19, 2009 || Mount Lemmon || Mount Lemmon Survey || VER || align=right | 4.7 km || 
|-id=582 bgcolor=#d6d6d6
| 472582 ||  || — || February 11, 2004 || Kitt Peak || Spacewatch || — || align=right | 2.4 km || 
|-id=583 bgcolor=#fefefe
| 472583 ||  || — || February 14, 2008 || Mount Lemmon || Mount Lemmon Survey || V || align=right data-sort-value="0.65" | 650 m || 
|-id=584 bgcolor=#fefefe
| 472584 ||  || — || April 21, 2002 || Kitt Peak || Spacewatch || — || align=right data-sort-value="0.93" | 930 m || 
|-id=585 bgcolor=#d6d6d6
| 472585 ||  || — || May 18, 2010 || WISE || WISE || — || align=right | 2.3 km || 
|-id=586 bgcolor=#E9E9E9
| 472586 ||  || — || May 2, 2010 || WISE || WISE || — || align=right | 2.2 km || 
|-id=587 bgcolor=#E9E9E9
| 472587 ||  || — || October 28, 2008 || Kitt Peak || Spacewatch || — || align=right | 3.4 km || 
|-id=588 bgcolor=#d6d6d6
| 472588 ||  || — || January 20, 2010 || WISE || WISE || EOS || align=right | 4.6 km || 
|-id=589 bgcolor=#fefefe
| 472589 ||  || — || December 22, 2006 || Kitt Peak || Spacewatch || V || align=right data-sort-value="0.85" | 850 m || 
|-id=590 bgcolor=#E9E9E9
| 472590 ||  || — || May 10, 2007 || Kitt Peak || Spacewatch || — || align=right | 1.4 km || 
|-id=591 bgcolor=#fefefe
| 472591 ||  || — || February 10, 2007 || Catalina || CSS || — || align=right | 3.9 km || 
|-id=592 bgcolor=#E9E9E9
| 472592 ||  || — || March 25, 2011 || Catalina || CSS || — || align=right | 1.4 km || 
|-id=593 bgcolor=#E9E9E9
| 472593 ||  || — || May 26, 2003 || Kitt Peak || Spacewatch || — || align=right | 2.6 km || 
|-id=594 bgcolor=#E9E9E9
| 472594 ||  || — || May 24, 2011 || Mount Lemmon || Mount Lemmon Survey || — || align=right | 2.3 km || 
|-id=595 bgcolor=#E9E9E9
| 472595 ||  || — || January 26, 2006 || Mount Lemmon || Mount Lemmon Survey || — || align=right | 1.7 km || 
|-id=596 bgcolor=#d6d6d6
| 472596 ||  || — || October 26, 2013 || Mount Lemmon || Mount Lemmon Survey || — || align=right | 2.9 km || 
|-id=597 bgcolor=#d6d6d6
| 472597 ||  || — || December 29, 2008 || Catalina || CSS || — || align=right | 4.3 km || 
|-id=598 bgcolor=#d6d6d6
| 472598 ||  || — || March 4, 2005 || Catalina || CSS || — || align=right | 2.4 km || 
|-id=599 bgcolor=#d6d6d6
| 472599 ||  || — || May 27, 1998 || Kitt Peak || Spacewatch || — || align=right | 2.7 km || 
|-id=600 bgcolor=#d6d6d6
| 472600 ||  || — || June 18, 2005 || Mount Lemmon || Mount Lemmon Survey || — || align=right | 4.1 km || 
|}

472601–472700 

|-bgcolor=#fefefe
| 472601 ||  || — || September 25, 2006 || Kitt Peak || Spacewatch || — || align=right data-sort-value="0.90" | 900 m || 
|-id=602 bgcolor=#d6d6d6
| 472602 ||  || — || February 9, 2010 || Kitt Peak || Spacewatch || — || align=right | 2.5 km || 
|-id=603 bgcolor=#fefefe
| 472603 ||  || — || December 12, 2006 || Kitt Peak || Spacewatch || — || align=right data-sort-value="0.81" | 810 m || 
|-id=604 bgcolor=#d6d6d6
| 472604 ||  || — || January 17, 2009 || Kitt Peak || Spacewatch || VER || align=right | 2.8 km || 
|-id=605 bgcolor=#fefefe
| 472605 ||  || — || March 31, 2008 || Kitt Peak || Spacewatch || — || align=right | 1.0 km || 
|-id=606 bgcolor=#d6d6d6
| 472606 ||  || — || March 20, 2010 || Mount Lemmon || Mount Lemmon Survey || — || align=right | 4.2 km || 
|-id=607 bgcolor=#E9E9E9
| 472607 ||  || — || February 25, 2006 || Kitt Peak || Spacewatch || — || align=right | 2.4 km || 
|-id=608 bgcolor=#E9E9E9
| 472608 ||  || — || January 4, 2006 || Mount Lemmon || Mount Lemmon Survey || — || align=right | 1.6 km || 
|-id=609 bgcolor=#fefefe
| 472609 ||  || — || February 25, 2008 || Mount Lemmon || Mount Lemmon Survey || — || align=right data-sort-value="0.65" | 650 m || 
|-id=610 bgcolor=#fefefe
| 472610 ||  || — || September 19, 2009 || Mount Lemmon || Mount Lemmon Survey || — || align=right data-sort-value="0.98" | 980 m || 
|-id=611 bgcolor=#E9E9E9
| 472611 ||  || — || March 16, 2010 || WISE || WISE || — || align=right | 2.3 km || 
|-id=612 bgcolor=#E9E9E9
| 472612 ||  || — || April 21, 2006 || Kitt Peak || Spacewatch || — || align=right | 1.6 km || 
|-id=613 bgcolor=#fefefe
| 472613 ||  || — || October 12, 2005 || Kitt Peak || Spacewatch || — || align=right data-sort-value="0.86" | 860 m || 
|-id=614 bgcolor=#fefefe
| 472614 ||  || — || January 30, 2011 || Mount Lemmon || Mount Lemmon Survey || — || align=right data-sort-value="0.78" | 780 m || 
|-id=615 bgcolor=#fefefe
| 472615 ||  || — || November 3, 2005 || Mount Lemmon || Mount Lemmon Survey || — || align=right | 1.1 km || 
|-id=616 bgcolor=#E9E9E9
| 472616 ||  || — || July 29, 2008 || Kitt Peak || Spacewatch || KON || align=right | 2.6 km || 
|-id=617 bgcolor=#E9E9E9
| 472617 ||  || — || April 18, 2007 || Kitt Peak || Spacewatch || — || align=right | 1.1 km || 
|-id=618 bgcolor=#E9E9E9
| 472618 ||  || — || September 7, 2008 || Mount Lemmon || Mount Lemmon Survey || — || align=right | 1.5 km || 
|-id=619 bgcolor=#d6d6d6
| 472619 ||  || — || April 13, 2010 || WISE || WISE || — || align=right | 3.5 km || 
|-id=620 bgcolor=#E9E9E9
| 472620 ||  || — || February 1, 2010 || WISE || WISE || — || align=right | 2.8 km || 
|-id=621 bgcolor=#d6d6d6
| 472621 ||  || — || January 31, 2010 || WISE || WISE || THB || align=right | 2.9 km || 
|-id=622 bgcolor=#fefefe
| 472622 ||  || — || November 16, 2006 || Mount Lemmon || Mount Lemmon Survey || — || align=right | 1.0 km || 
|-id=623 bgcolor=#E9E9E9
| 472623 ||  || — || May 16, 2007 || Siding Spring || SSS || — || align=right | 1.5 km || 
|-id=624 bgcolor=#E9E9E9
| 472624 ||  || — || June 2, 2003 || Kitt Peak || Spacewatch || — || align=right | 1.1 km || 
|-id=625 bgcolor=#fefefe
| 472625 ||  || — || January 5, 2011 || Mount Lemmon || Mount Lemmon Survey || — || align=right | 1.2 km || 
|-id=626 bgcolor=#fefefe
| 472626 ||  || — || October 4, 2006 || Mount Lemmon || Mount Lemmon Survey || — || align=right data-sort-value="0.93" | 930 m || 
|-id=627 bgcolor=#d6d6d6
| 472627 ||  || — || August 27, 2006 || Anderson Mesa || LONEOS || — || align=right | 3.9 km || 
|-id=628 bgcolor=#fefefe
| 472628 ||  || — || December 26, 2011 || Mount Lemmon || Mount Lemmon Survey || H || align=right data-sort-value="0.54" | 540 m || 
|-id=629 bgcolor=#fefefe
| 472629 ||  || — || May 6, 2010 || Mount Lemmon || Mount Lemmon Survey || H || align=right data-sort-value="0.72" | 720 m || 
|-id=630 bgcolor=#E9E9E9
| 472630 ||  || — || April 11, 2011 || Mount Lemmon || Mount Lemmon Survey || — || align=right | 1.00 km || 
|-id=631 bgcolor=#E9E9E9
| 472631 ||  || — || February 9, 2010 || Mount Lemmon || Mount Lemmon Survey || — || align=right | 1.5 km || 
|-id=632 bgcolor=#d6d6d6
| 472632 ||  || — || April 14, 2010 || Kitt Peak || Spacewatch || EOS || align=right | 1.9 km || 
|-id=633 bgcolor=#E9E9E9
| 472633 ||  || — || December 19, 2009 || Mount Lemmon || Mount Lemmon Survey || — || align=right | 3.6 km || 
|-id=634 bgcolor=#E9E9E9
| 472634 ||  || — || May 24, 2006 || Kitt Peak || Spacewatch || — || align=right | 2.3 km || 
|-id=635 bgcolor=#d6d6d6
| 472635 ||  || — || February 26, 2009 || Kitt Peak || Spacewatch || — || align=right | 2.3 km || 
|-id=636 bgcolor=#E9E9E9
| 472636 ||  || — || June 4, 2011 || Mount Lemmon || Mount Lemmon Survey || — || align=right | 1.5 km || 
|-id=637 bgcolor=#E9E9E9
| 472637 ||  || — || December 21, 2000 || Kitt Peak || Spacewatch || — || align=right | 1.8 km || 
|-id=638 bgcolor=#E9E9E9
| 472638 ||  || — || November 18, 2008 || Kitt Peak || Spacewatch || — || align=right | 2.2 km || 
|-id=639 bgcolor=#E9E9E9
| 472639 ||  || — || June 3, 2011 || Mount Lemmon || Mount Lemmon Survey || — || align=right | 1.9 km || 
|-id=640 bgcolor=#E9E9E9
| 472640 ||  || — || April 25, 2007 || Mount Lemmon || Mount Lemmon Survey || — || align=right | 1.3 km || 
|-id=641 bgcolor=#E9E9E9
| 472641 ||  || — || September 28, 2003 || Anderson Mesa || LONEOS || — || align=right | 2.9 km || 
|-id=642 bgcolor=#fefefe
| 472642 ||  || — || January 17, 2007 || Kitt Peak || Spacewatch || V || align=right data-sort-value="0.67" | 670 m || 
|-id=643 bgcolor=#d6d6d6
| 472643 ||  || — || December 4, 2007 || Kitt Peak || Spacewatch || EMA || align=right | 4.8 km || 
|-id=644 bgcolor=#fefefe
| 472644 ||  || — || June 13, 2005 || Mount Lemmon || Mount Lemmon Survey || — || align=right | 1.0 km || 
|-id=645 bgcolor=#E9E9E9
| 472645 ||  || — || January 8, 2010 || Kitt Peak || Spacewatch || — || align=right | 1.9 km || 
|-id=646 bgcolor=#d6d6d6
| 472646 ||  || — || December 31, 2007 || Kitt Peak || Spacewatch || EOS || align=right | 2.2 km || 
|-id=647 bgcolor=#d6d6d6
| 472647 ||  || — || February 3, 2009 || Mount Lemmon || Mount Lemmon Survey || — || align=right | 2.8 km || 
|-id=648 bgcolor=#E9E9E9
| 472648 ||  || — || December 18, 2004 || Mount Lemmon || Mount Lemmon Survey || — || align=right | 2.4 km || 
|-id=649 bgcolor=#fefefe
| 472649 ||  || — || February 23, 2007 || Kitt Peak || Spacewatch || — || align=right | 1.0 km || 
|-id=650 bgcolor=#E9E9E9
| 472650 ||  || — || August 17, 1999 || Kitt Peak || Spacewatch || — || align=right | 1.3 km || 
|-id=651 bgcolor=#C7FF8F
| 472651 ||  || — || February 27, 2015 || Mount Lemmon || Mount Lemmon Survey || centaur || align=right | 86 km || 
|-id=652 bgcolor=#E9E9E9
| 472652 ||  || — || February 27, 2006 || Kitt Peak || Spacewatch || — || align=right | 1.9 km || 
|-id=653 bgcolor=#E9E9E9
| 472653 ||  || — || July 25, 1998 || Prescott || P. G. Comba || — || align=right | 3.0 km || 
|-id=654 bgcolor=#fefefe
| 472654 ||  || — || July 1, 2005 || Kitt Peak || Spacewatch || — || align=right data-sort-value="0.76" | 760 m || 
|-id=655 bgcolor=#fefefe
| 472655 ||  || — || December 30, 2007 || Kitt Peak || Spacewatch || — || align=right data-sort-value="0.61" | 610 m || 
|-id=656 bgcolor=#d6d6d6
| 472656 ||  || — || November 28, 2013 || Mount Lemmon || Mount Lemmon Survey || 615 || align=right | 1.6 km || 
|-id=657 bgcolor=#d6d6d6
| 472657 ||  || — || February 26, 2009 || Catalina || CSS || — || align=right | 2.3 km || 
|-id=658 bgcolor=#fefefe
| 472658 ||  || — || January 27, 2011 || Kitt Peak || Spacewatch || — || align=right data-sort-value="0.73" | 730 m || 
|-id=659 bgcolor=#d6d6d6
| 472659 ||  || — || October 8, 2005 || Kitt Peak || Spacewatch || Tj (2.96) || align=right | 3.2 km || 
|-id=660 bgcolor=#d6d6d6
| 472660 ||  || — || July 26, 2010 || WISE || WISE || — || align=right | 5.0 km || 
|-id=661 bgcolor=#E9E9E9
| 472661 ||  || — || March 5, 2006 || Mount Lemmon || Mount Lemmon Survey || — || align=right | 2.4 km || 
|-id=662 bgcolor=#d6d6d6
| 472662 ||  || — || April 9, 2010 || Kitt Peak || Spacewatch || — || align=right | 2.6 km || 
|-id=663 bgcolor=#fefefe
| 472663 ||  || — || October 27, 2006 || Kitt Peak || Spacewatch || — || align=right data-sort-value="0.86" | 860 m || 
|-id=664 bgcolor=#fefefe
| 472664 ||  || — || October 20, 2006 || Kitt Peak || Spacewatch || NYS || align=right data-sort-value="0.69" | 690 m || 
|-id=665 bgcolor=#fefefe
| 472665 ||  || — || August 15, 2009 || Kitt Peak || Spacewatch || — || align=right data-sort-value="0.90" | 900 m || 
|-id=666 bgcolor=#d6d6d6
| 472666 ||  || — || September 19, 2001 || Socorro || LINEAR || — || align=right | 3.4 km || 
|-id=667 bgcolor=#d6d6d6
| 472667 ||  || — || February 16, 2010 || Kitt Peak || Spacewatch || EOS || align=right | 2.9 km || 
|-id=668 bgcolor=#d6d6d6
| 472668 ||  || — || June 22, 2010 || WISE || WISE || — || align=right | 2.5 km || 
|-id=669 bgcolor=#E9E9E9
| 472669 ||  || — || April 12, 2011 || Mount Lemmon || Mount Lemmon Survey || — || align=right | 1.4 km || 
|-id=670 bgcolor=#fefefe
| 472670 ||  || — || March 4, 2012 || Mount Lemmon || Mount Lemmon Survey || — || align=right data-sort-value="0.73" | 730 m || 
|-id=671 bgcolor=#fefefe
| 472671 ||  || — || February 28, 2008 || Mount Lemmon || Mount Lemmon Survey || — || align=right data-sort-value="0.68" | 680 m || 
|-id=672 bgcolor=#fefefe
| 472672 ||  || — || October 10, 2010 || Kitt Peak || Spacewatch || — || align=right data-sort-value="0.68" | 680 m || 
|-id=673 bgcolor=#E9E9E9
| 472673 ||  || — || September 11, 2004 || Kitt Peak || Spacewatch || MAR || align=right | 1.2 km || 
|-id=674 bgcolor=#d6d6d6
| 472674 ||  || — || March 15, 2004 || Kitt Peak || Spacewatch || — || align=right | 2.9 km || 
|-id=675 bgcolor=#fefefe
| 472675 ||  || — || March 14, 2004 || Kitt Peak || Spacewatch || NYS || align=right data-sort-value="0.58" | 580 m || 
|-id=676 bgcolor=#fefefe
| 472676 ||  || — || May 31, 2012 || Mount Lemmon || Mount Lemmon Survey || V || align=right data-sort-value="0.62" | 620 m || 
|-id=677 bgcolor=#fefefe
| 472677 ||  || — || March 25, 2000 || Kitt Peak || Spacewatch || NYS || align=right data-sort-value="0.76" | 760 m || 
|-id=678 bgcolor=#fefefe
| 472678 ||  || — || August 18, 2006 || Kitt Peak || Spacewatch || — || align=right data-sort-value="0.83" | 830 m || 
|-id=679 bgcolor=#E9E9E9
| 472679 ||  || — || March 16, 2007 || Kitt Peak || Spacewatch || — || align=right data-sort-value="0.98" | 980 m || 
|-id=680 bgcolor=#E9E9E9
| 472680 ||  || — || February 24, 2006 || Mount Lemmon || Mount Lemmon Survey || AEO || align=right | 1.2 km || 
|-id=681 bgcolor=#E9E9E9
| 472681 ||  || — || September 12, 2007 || Catalina || CSS || — || align=right | 2.7 km || 
|-id=682 bgcolor=#d6d6d6
| 472682 ||  || — || May 7, 2006 || Mount Lemmon || Mount Lemmon Survey || — || align=right | 3.0 km || 
|-id=683 bgcolor=#d6d6d6
| 472683 ||  || — || March 18, 2004 || Socorro || LINEAR || — || align=right | 3.5 km || 
|-id=684 bgcolor=#E9E9E9
| 472684 ||  || — || August 24, 2007 || Kitt Peak || Spacewatch || — || align=right | 2.2 km || 
|-id=685 bgcolor=#E9E9E9
| 472685 ||  || — || January 7, 2010 || Mount Lemmon || Mount Lemmon Survey || — || align=right | 2.0 km || 
|-id=686 bgcolor=#fefefe
| 472686 ||  || — || July 14, 2004 || Siding Spring || SSS || — || align=right | 1.0 km || 
|-id=687 bgcolor=#d6d6d6
| 472687 ||  || — || March 22, 2004 || Anderson Mesa || LONEOS || — || align=right | 3.9 km || 
|-id=688 bgcolor=#E9E9E9
| 472688 ||  || — || April 18, 2007 || Mount Lemmon || Mount Lemmon Survey || RAF || align=right data-sort-value="0.86" | 860 m || 
|-id=689 bgcolor=#fefefe
| 472689 ||  || — || September 21, 2003 || Kitt Peak || Spacewatch || — || align=right data-sort-value="0.83" | 830 m || 
|-id=690 bgcolor=#d6d6d6
| 472690 ||  || — || November 30, 2008 || Mount Lemmon || Mount Lemmon Survey || — || align=right | 3.1 km || 
|-id=691 bgcolor=#E9E9E9
| 472691 ||  || — || January 7, 2010 || Kitt Peak || Spacewatch || — || align=right | 2.0 km || 
|-id=692 bgcolor=#E9E9E9
| 472692 ||  || — || September 23, 2008 || Kitt Peak || Spacewatch || — || align=right | 2.2 km || 
|-id=693 bgcolor=#fefefe
| 472693 ||  || — || January 31, 2008 || Catalina || CSS || — || align=right data-sort-value="0.67" | 670 m || 
|-id=694 bgcolor=#fefefe
| 472694 ||  || — || June 11, 2013 || Mount Lemmon || Mount Lemmon Survey || H || align=right data-sort-value="0.68" | 680 m || 
|-id=695 bgcolor=#E9E9E9
| 472695 ||  || — || January 26, 2006 || Kitt Peak || Spacewatch || — || align=right | 2.2 km || 
|-id=696 bgcolor=#E9E9E9
| 472696 ||  || — || November 6, 2005 || Mount Lemmon || Mount Lemmon Survey || — || align=right | 1.0 km || 
|-id=697 bgcolor=#E9E9E9
| 472697 ||  || — || April 20, 2006 || Kitt Peak || Spacewatch || — || align=right | 2.5 km || 
|-id=698 bgcolor=#d6d6d6
| 472698 ||  || — || April 24, 2004 || Kitt Peak || Spacewatch || — || align=right | 4.0 km || 
|-id=699 bgcolor=#d6d6d6
| 472699 ||  || — || September 29, 2000 || Anderson Mesa || LONEOS || — || align=right | 2.1 km || 
|-id=700 bgcolor=#E9E9E9
| 472700 ||  || — || May 2, 2003 || Catalina || CSS || EUN || align=right | 1.5 km || 
|}

472701–472800 

|-bgcolor=#E9E9E9
| 472701 ||  || — || May 22, 2011 || Mount Lemmon || Mount Lemmon Survey || EUN || align=right data-sort-value="0.84" | 840 m || 
|-id=702 bgcolor=#d6d6d6
| 472702 ||  || — || September 14, 2006 || Kitt Peak || Spacewatch || — || align=right | 2.3 km || 
|-id=703 bgcolor=#d6d6d6
| 472703 ||  || — || April 21, 1998 || Kitt Peak || Spacewatch || — || align=right | 3.4 km || 
|-id=704 bgcolor=#E9E9E9
| 472704 ||  || — || November 3, 2008 || Kitt Peak || Spacewatch || — || align=right | 1.6 km || 
|-id=705 bgcolor=#E9E9E9
| 472705 ||  || — || December 14, 2004 || Kitt Peak || Spacewatch || — || align=right | 2.6 km || 
|-id=706 bgcolor=#E9E9E9
| 472706 ||  || — || March 9, 2005 || Mount Lemmon || Mount Lemmon Survey || — || align=right | 2.3 km || 
|-id=707 bgcolor=#E9E9E9
| 472707 ||  || — || December 11, 2004 || Campo Imperatore || CINEOS || — || align=right | 1.5 km || 
|-id=708 bgcolor=#d6d6d6
| 472708 ||  || — || March 26, 2004 || Kitt Peak || Spacewatch || EOS || align=right | 2.1 km || 
|-id=709 bgcolor=#d6d6d6
| 472709 ||  || — || July 8, 2005 || Catalina || CSS || TIR || align=right | 3.0 km || 
|-id=710 bgcolor=#E9E9E9
| 472710 ||  || — || March 26, 2006 || Mount Lemmon || Mount Lemmon Survey || — || align=right | 1.6 km || 
|-id=711 bgcolor=#d6d6d6
| 472711 ||  || — || January 31, 2009 || Mount Lemmon || Mount Lemmon Survey || — || align=right | 2.5 km || 
|-id=712 bgcolor=#d6d6d6
| 472712 ||  || — || February 19, 2009 || Mount Lemmon || Mount Lemmon Survey || — || align=right | 2.0 km || 
|-id=713 bgcolor=#d6d6d6
| 472713 ||  || — || September 19, 2006 || Kitt Peak || Spacewatch || — || align=right | 2.5 km || 
|-id=714 bgcolor=#d6d6d6
| 472714 ||  || — || January 15, 2008 || Mount Lemmon || Mount Lemmon Survey || — || align=right | 2.6 km || 
|-id=715 bgcolor=#fefefe
| 472715 ||  || — || October 3, 2006 || Mount Lemmon || Mount Lemmon Survey || — || align=right data-sort-value="0.67" | 670 m || 
|-id=716 bgcolor=#E9E9E9
| 472716 ||  || — || March 26, 2011 || Mount Lemmon || Mount Lemmon Survey || — || align=right | 1.4 km || 
|-id=717 bgcolor=#fefefe
| 472717 ||  || — || April 12, 2004 || Siding Spring || SSS || — || align=right | 1.1 km || 
|-id=718 bgcolor=#E9E9E9
| 472718 ||  || — || June 19, 2012 || Kitt Peak || Spacewatch || — || align=right | 2.0 km || 
|-id=719 bgcolor=#E9E9E9
| 472719 ||  || — || January 9, 2010 || Mount Lemmon || Mount Lemmon Survey || — || align=right | 3.4 km || 
|-id=720 bgcolor=#E9E9E9
| 472720 ||  || — || October 30, 2008 || Kitt Peak || Spacewatch || — || align=right | 2.6 km || 
|-id=721 bgcolor=#E9E9E9
| 472721 ||  || — || February 13, 2010 || Catalina || CSS || — || align=right | 2.8 km || 
|-id=722 bgcolor=#d6d6d6
| 472722 ||  || — || February 18, 2008 || Mount Lemmon || Mount Lemmon Survey || 7:4 || align=right | 4.5 km || 
|-id=723 bgcolor=#E9E9E9
| 472723 ||  || — || January 2, 2006 || Socorro || LINEAR || — || align=right | 1.2 km || 
|-id=724 bgcolor=#E9E9E9
| 472724 ||  || — || September 23, 2008 || Mount Lemmon || Mount Lemmon Survey || — || align=right data-sort-value="0.89" | 890 m || 
|-id=725 bgcolor=#d6d6d6
| 472725 ||  || — || December 30, 2013 || Kitt Peak || Spacewatch || KOR || align=right | 1.2 km || 
|-id=726 bgcolor=#d6d6d6
| 472726 ||  || — || October 18, 2006 || Kitt Peak || Spacewatch || — || align=right | 2.7 km || 
|-id=727 bgcolor=#E9E9E9
| 472727 ||  || — || March 26, 2006 || Kitt Peak || Spacewatch || MRX || align=right | 1.2 km || 
|-id=728 bgcolor=#E9E9E9
| 472728 ||  || — || February 4, 2005 || Kitt Peak || Spacewatch || — || align=right | 2.1 km || 
|-id=729 bgcolor=#E9E9E9
| 472729 ||  || — || May 2, 2003 || Kitt Peak || Spacewatch || — || align=right | 2.7 km || 
|-id=730 bgcolor=#E9E9E9
| 472730 ||  || — || October 8, 2012 || Mount Lemmon || Mount Lemmon Survey || — || align=right | 2.6 km || 
|-id=731 bgcolor=#d6d6d6
| 472731 ||  || — || May 7, 2010 || Mount Lemmon || Mount Lemmon Survey || — || align=right | 2.3 km || 
|-id=732 bgcolor=#d6d6d6
| 472732 ||  || — || October 12, 2007 || Mount Lemmon || Mount Lemmon Survey || — || align=right | 2.6 km || 
|-id=733 bgcolor=#d6d6d6
| 472733 ||  || — || May 16, 2005 || Kitt Peak || Spacewatch || — || align=right | 3.3 km || 
|-id=734 bgcolor=#E9E9E9
| 472734 ||  || — || February 7, 2002 || Socorro || LINEAR || — || align=right | 1.3 km || 
|-id=735 bgcolor=#d6d6d6
| 472735 ||  || — || May 23, 2004 || Kitt Peak || Spacewatch || — || align=right | 3.5 km || 
|-id=736 bgcolor=#fefefe
| 472736 ||  || — || January 24, 2007 || Catalina || CSS || MAS || align=right data-sort-value="0.74" | 740 m || 
|-id=737 bgcolor=#fefefe
| 472737 ||  || — || April 22, 2004 || Kitt Peak || Spacewatch || — || align=right data-sort-value="0.84" | 840 m || 
|-id=738 bgcolor=#E9E9E9
| 472738 ||  || — || February 20, 2006 || Kitt Peak || Spacewatch || — || align=right | 1.5 km || 
|-id=739 bgcolor=#E9E9E9
| 472739 ||  || — || October 10, 2012 || Mount Lemmon || Mount Lemmon Survey || — || align=right | 2.1 km || 
|-id=740 bgcolor=#d6d6d6
| 472740 ||  || — || January 30, 2009 || Mount Lemmon || Mount Lemmon Survey || — || align=right | 2.2 km || 
|-id=741 bgcolor=#d6d6d6
| 472741 ||  || — || February 28, 2010 || WISE || WISE || LIX || align=right | 3.1 km || 
|-id=742 bgcolor=#fefefe
| 472742 ||  || — || December 21, 2006 || Kitt Peak || Spacewatch || — || align=right | 1.0 km || 
|-id=743 bgcolor=#fefefe
| 472743 ||  || — || September 29, 2009 || Mount Lemmon || Mount Lemmon Survey || — || align=right | 1.1 km || 
|-id=744 bgcolor=#E9E9E9
| 472744 ||  || — || October 8, 2008 || Mount Lemmon || Mount Lemmon Survey || — || align=right | 1.6 km || 
|-id=745 bgcolor=#d6d6d6
| 472745 ||  || — || August 25, 1995 || Kitt Peak || Spacewatch || EOS || align=right | 2.0 km || 
|-id=746 bgcolor=#fefefe
| 472746 ||  || — || January 18, 2008 || Mount Lemmon || Mount Lemmon Survey || — || align=right data-sort-value="0.80" | 800 m || 
|-id=747 bgcolor=#E9E9E9
| 472747 ||  || — || January 23, 2006 || Kitt Peak || Spacewatch || — || align=right | 2.1 km || 
|-id=748 bgcolor=#fefefe
| 472748 ||  || — || June 3, 2008 || Mount Lemmon || Mount Lemmon Survey || — || align=right | 1.0 km || 
|-id=749 bgcolor=#d6d6d6
| 472749 ||  || — || January 25, 2009 || Kitt Peak || Spacewatch || LIX || align=right | 3.0 km || 
|-id=750 bgcolor=#E9E9E9
| 472750 ||  || — || October 8, 2008 || Mount Lemmon || Mount Lemmon Survey || — || align=right | 1.7 km || 
|-id=751 bgcolor=#E9E9E9
| 472751 ||  || — || January 7, 2010 || Kitt Peak || Spacewatch || — || align=right | 1.5 km || 
|-id=752 bgcolor=#fefefe
| 472752 ||  || — || May 8, 2008 || Mount Lemmon || Mount Lemmon Survey || — || align=right data-sort-value="0.99" | 990 m || 
|-id=753 bgcolor=#E9E9E9
| 472753 ||  || — || September 10, 2004 || Kitt Peak || Spacewatch || — || align=right | 1.2 km || 
|-id=754 bgcolor=#E9E9E9
| 472754 ||  || — || October 1, 2008 || Mount Lemmon || Mount Lemmon Survey || — || align=right | 2.3 km || 
|-id=755 bgcolor=#fefefe
| 472755 ||  || — || February 12, 2008 || Mount Lemmon || Mount Lemmon Survey || (1338) || align=right data-sort-value="0.87" | 870 m || 
|-id=756 bgcolor=#fefefe
| 472756 ||  || — || January 9, 2007 || Mount Lemmon || Mount Lemmon Survey || — || align=right data-sort-value="0.84" | 840 m || 
|-id=757 bgcolor=#fefefe
| 472757 ||  || — || May 15, 2005 || Mount Lemmon || Mount Lemmon Survey || — || align=right data-sort-value="0.98" | 980 m || 
|-id=758 bgcolor=#E9E9E9
| 472758 ||  || — || September 22, 2008 || Kitt Peak || Spacewatch || — || align=right | 1.7 km || 
|-id=759 bgcolor=#fefefe
| 472759 ||  || — || August 21, 2006 || Kitt Peak || Spacewatch || — || align=right data-sort-value="0.72" | 720 m || 
|-id=760 bgcolor=#C7FF8F
| 472760 ||  || — || March 23, 2015 || Haleakala || Pan-STARRS || centaurcritical || align=right | 29 km || 
|-id=761 bgcolor=#fefefe
| 472761 ||  || — || January 10, 2007 || Kitt Peak || Spacewatch || — || align=right | 1.2 km || 
|-id=762 bgcolor=#E9E9E9
| 472762 ||  || — || March 26, 2011 || Catalina || CSS || — || align=right | 1.5 km || 
|-id=763 bgcolor=#E9E9E9
| 472763 ||  || — || September 21, 2003 || Kitt Peak || Spacewatch || — || align=right | 2.8 km || 
|-id=764 bgcolor=#fefefe
| 472764 ||  || — || December 16, 2006 || Kitt Peak || Spacewatch || — || align=right data-sort-value="0.72" | 720 m || 
|-id=765 bgcolor=#d6d6d6
| 472765 ||  || — || March 1, 2009 || Mount Lemmon || Mount Lemmon Survey || — || align=right | 4.4 km || 
|-id=766 bgcolor=#E9E9E9
| 472766 ||  || — || February 11, 2011 || Mount Lemmon || Mount Lemmon Survey || — || align=right data-sort-value="0.81" | 810 m || 
|-id=767 bgcolor=#fefefe
| 472767 ||  || — || February 8, 2000 || Kitt Peak || Spacewatch || NYS || align=right data-sort-value="0.70" | 700 m || 
|-id=768 bgcolor=#E9E9E9
| 472768 ||  || — || August 10, 2007 || Kitt Peak || Spacewatch || — || align=right | 2.4 km || 
|-id=769 bgcolor=#fefefe
| 472769 ||  || — || May 16, 2002 || Socorro || LINEAR || — || align=right data-sort-value="0.72" | 720 m || 
|-id=770 bgcolor=#E9E9E9
| 472770 ||  || — || April 20, 2007 || Kitt Peak || Spacewatch || — || align=right | 1.1 km || 
|-id=771 bgcolor=#E9E9E9
| 472771 ||  || — || June 4, 2011 || Mount Lemmon || Mount Lemmon Survey || — || align=right | 1.8 km || 
|-id=772 bgcolor=#E9E9E9
| 472772 ||  || — || January 13, 2010 || Mount Lemmon || Mount Lemmon Survey || DOR || align=right | 2.5 km || 
|-id=773 bgcolor=#d6d6d6
| 472773 ||  || — || February 2, 2009 || Mount Lemmon || Mount Lemmon Survey || — || align=right | 4.4 km || 
|-id=774 bgcolor=#fefefe
| 472774 ||  || — || April 13, 2004 || Kitt Peak || Spacewatch || — || align=right data-sort-value="0.85" | 850 m || 
|-id=775 bgcolor=#fefefe
| 472775 ||  || — || January 30, 2008 || Kitt Peak || Spacewatch || — || align=right data-sort-value="0.77" | 770 m || 
|-id=776 bgcolor=#E9E9E9
| 472776 ||  || — || December 5, 2005 || Kitt Peak || Spacewatch || — || align=right | 1.0 km || 
|-id=777 bgcolor=#d6d6d6
| 472777 ||  || — || September 25, 2006 || Mount Lemmon || Mount Lemmon Survey || — || align=right | 1.9 km || 
|-id=778 bgcolor=#d6d6d6
| 472778 ||  || — || August 30, 2005 || Kitt Peak || Spacewatch || THB || align=right | 3.5 km || 
|-id=779 bgcolor=#d6d6d6
| 472779 ||  || — || June 30, 2005 || Kitt Peak || Spacewatch || — || align=right | 2.4 km || 
|-id=780 bgcolor=#fefefe
| 472780 ||  || — || November 1, 2000 || Socorro || LINEAR || — || align=right data-sort-value="0.77" | 770 m || 
|-id=781 bgcolor=#E9E9E9
| 472781 ||  || — || September 26, 2008 || Kitt Peak || Spacewatch || MRX || align=right data-sort-value="0.85" | 850 m || 
|-id=782 bgcolor=#fefefe
| 472782 ||  || — || March 11, 2008 || Kitt Peak || Spacewatch || (2076) || align=right data-sort-value="0.79" | 790 m || 
|-id=783 bgcolor=#E9E9E9
| 472783 ||  || — || October 5, 2003 || Kitt Peak || Spacewatch || — || align=right | 2.3 km || 
|-id=784 bgcolor=#E9E9E9
| 472784 ||  || — || May 2, 2006 || Kitt Peak || Spacewatch || GEF || align=right | 1.2 km || 
|-id=785 bgcolor=#fefefe
| 472785 ||  || — || March 29, 2008 || Kitt Peak || Spacewatch || — || align=right data-sort-value="0.58" | 580 m || 
|-id=786 bgcolor=#fefefe
| 472786 ||  || — || October 27, 2006 || Mount Lemmon || Mount Lemmon Survey || — || align=right data-sort-value="0.79" | 790 m || 
|-id=787 bgcolor=#fefefe
| 472787 ||  || — || October 24, 2005 || Kitt Peak || Spacewatch || — || align=right | 1.0 km || 
|-id=788 bgcolor=#E9E9E9
| 472788 ||  || — || September 23, 2008 || Mount Lemmon || Mount Lemmon Survey || — || align=right | 1.3 km || 
|-id=789 bgcolor=#fefefe
| 472789 ||  || — || April 5, 2000 || Socorro || LINEAR || — || align=right data-sort-value="0.90" | 900 m || 
|-id=790 bgcolor=#fefefe
| 472790 ||  || — || December 20, 2007 || Mount Lemmon || Mount Lemmon Survey || — || align=right data-sort-value="0.75" | 750 m || 
|-id=791 bgcolor=#E9E9E9
| 472791 ||  || — || April 26, 2006 || Kitt Peak || Spacewatch || — || align=right | 1.7 km || 
|-id=792 bgcolor=#d6d6d6
| 472792 ||  || — || November 3, 2007 || Kitt Peak || Spacewatch || THM || align=right | 2.5 km || 
|-id=793 bgcolor=#E9E9E9
| 472793 ||  || — || January 22, 2006 || Mount Lemmon || Mount Lemmon Survey || — || align=right | 1.3 km || 
|-id=794 bgcolor=#E9E9E9
| 472794 ||  || — || March 4, 2011 || Mount Lemmon || Mount Lemmon Survey || — || align=right | 1.1 km || 
|-id=795 bgcolor=#E9E9E9
| 472795 ||  || — || October 3, 2003 || Kitt Peak || Spacewatch || — || align=right | 3.4 km || 
|-id=796 bgcolor=#E9E9E9
| 472796 ||  || — || November 5, 2005 || Kitt Peak || Spacewatch || — || align=right data-sort-value="0.79" | 790 m || 
|-id=797 bgcolor=#E9E9E9
| 472797 ||  || — || March 24, 2006 || Mount Lemmon || Mount Lemmon Survey || — || align=right | 1.9 km || 
|-id=798 bgcolor=#fefefe
| 472798 ||  || — || April 30, 2005 || Kitt Peak || Spacewatch || — || align=right data-sort-value="0.79" | 790 m || 
|-id=799 bgcolor=#E9E9E9
| 472799 ||  || — || September 23, 2008 || Mount Lemmon || Mount Lemmon Survey || — || align=right | 1.3 km || 
|-id=800 bgcolor=#E9E9E9
| 472800 ||  || — || January 8, 2010 || Kitt Peak || Spacewatch || — || align=right | 2.2 km || 
|}

472801–472900 

|-bgcolor=#d6d6d6
| 472801 ||  || — || February 19, 2009 || Mount Lemmon || Mount Lemmon Survey || — || align=right | 2.9 km || 
|-id=802 bgcolor=#d6d6d6
| 472802 ||  || — || October 31, 2006 || Mount Lemmon || Mount Lemmon Survey || — || align=right | 3.0 km || 
|-id=803 bgcolor=#E9E9E9
| 472803 ||  || — || March 16, 2007 || Mount Lemmon || Mount Lemmon Survey || — || align=right | 1.1 km || 
|-id=804 bgcolor=#d6d6d6
| 472804 ||  || — || November 11, 2001 || Kitt Peak || Spacewatch || — || align=right | 3.5 km || 
|-id=805 bgcolor=#E9E9E9
| 472805 ||  || — || May 2, 2003 || Kitt Peak || Spacewatch || — || align=right | 1.1 km || 
|-id=806 bgcolor=#E9E9E9
| 472806 ||  || — || February 16, 2010 || Kitt Peak || Spacewatch || WIT || align=right data-sort-value="0.98" | 980 m || 
|-id=807 bgcolor=#E9E9E9
| 472807 ||  || — || January 16, 1996 || Kitt Peak || Spacewatch || AGN || align=right | 1.4 km || 
|-id=808 bgcolor=#d6d6d6
| 472808 ||  || — || May 13, 2004 || Kitt Peak || Spacewatch || — || align=right | 2.9 km || 
|-id=809 bgcolor=#E9E9E9
| 472809 ||  || — || May 8, 2011 || Kitt Peak || Spacewatch || — || align=right | 1.3 km || 
|-id=810 bgcolor=#E9E9E9
| 472810 ||  || — || March 28, 1993 || Kitt Peak || Spacewatch || — || align=right | 1.6 km || 
|-id=811 bgcolor=#E9E9E9
| 472811 ||  || — || February 14, 2010 || Mount Lemmon || Mount Lemmon Survey || — || align=right | 1.5 km || 
|-id=812 bgcolor=#E9E9E9
| 472812 ||  || — || October 1, 2008 || Kitt Peak || Spacewatch || MRX || align=right | 1.1 km || 
|-id=813 bgcolor=#fefefe
| 472813 ||  || — || December 24, 2006 || Kitt Peak || Spacewatch || — || align=right data-sort-value="0.61" | 610 m || 
|-id=814 bgcolor=#E9E9E9
| 472814 ||  || — || April 30, 2006 || Kitt Peak || Spacewatch || — || align=right | 2.3 km || 
|-id=815 bgcolor=#fefefe
| 472815 ||  || — || February 18, 2008 || Mount Lemmon || Mount Lemmon Survey || — || align=right data-sort-value="0.72" | 720 m || 
|-id=816 bgcolor=#E9E9E9
| 472816 ||  || — || October 27, 2008 || Mount Lemmon || Mount Lemmon Survey || — || align=right | 2.1 km || 
|-id=817 bgcolor=#d6d6d6
| 472817 ||  || — || February 26, 2009 || Kitt Peak || Spacewatch || LIX || align=right | 3.2 km || 
|-id=818 bgcolor=#E9E9E9
| 472818 ||  || — || October 27, 2003 || Kitt Peak || Spacewatch || — || align=right | 3.6 km || 
|-id=819 bgcolor=#E9E9E9
| 472819 ||  || — || October 11, 2012 || Mount Lemmon || Mount Lemmon Survey || AGN || align=right data-sort-value="0.98" | 980 m || 
|-id=820 bgcolor=#E9E9E9
| 472820 ||  || — || October 24, 2003 || Kitt Peak || Spacewatch || HOF || align=right | 2.1 km || 
|-id=821 bgcolor=#fefefe
| 472821 ||  || — || May 10, 2005 || Kitt Peak || Spacewatch || — || align=right | 1.1 km || 
|-id=822 bgcolor=#fefefe
| 472822 ||  || — || February 17, 2007 || Kitt Peak || Spacewatch || — || align=right data-sort-value="0.74" | 740 m || 
|-id=823 bgcolor=#d6d6d6
| 472823 ||  || — || July 24, 2010 || WISE || WISE || — || align=right | 2.3 km || 
|-id=824 bgcolor=#E9E9E9
| 472824 ||  || — || February 25, 2006 || Kitt Peak || Spacewatch || — || align=right | 1.4 km || 
|-id=825 bgcolor=#d6d6d6
| 472825 ||  || — || April 14, 2010 || Mount Lemmon || Mount Lemmon Survey || EOS || align=right | 1.8 km || 
|-id=826 bgcolor=#d6d6d6
| 472826 ||  || — || February 22, 2004 || Kitt Peak || Spacewatch || — || align=right | 2.9 km || 
|-id=827 bgcolor=#E9E9E9
| 472827 ||  || — || September 6, 2012 || Mount Lemmon || Mount Lemmon Survey || — || align=right | 2.1 km || 
|-id=828 bgcolor=#E9E9E9
| 472828 ||  || — || March 3, 2006 || Kitt Peak || Spacewatch || — || align=right | 2.2 km || 
|-id=829 bgcolor=#fefefe
| 472829 ||  || — || November 15, 2006 || Kitt Peak || Spacewatch || — || align=right data-sort-value="0.78" | 780 m || 
|-id=830 bgcolor=#fefefe
| 472830 ||  || — || June 14, 2012 || Mount Lemmon || Mount Lemmon Survey || — || align=right data-sort-value="0.56" | 560 m || 
|-id=831 bgcolor=#E9E9E9
| 472831 ||  || — || November 21, 2009 || Mount Lemmon || Mount Lemmon Survey || — || align=right | 1.9 km || 
|-id=832 bgcolor=#fefefe
| 472832 ||  || — || February 17, 2004 || Kitt Peak || Spacewatch || NYS || align=right data-sort-value="0.61" | 610 m || 
|-id=833 bgcolor=#d6d6d6
| 472833 ||  || — || November 19, 2007 || Kitt Peak || Spacewatch || — || align=right | 2.8 km || 
|-id=834 bgcolor=#E9E9E9
| 472834 ||  || — || December 25, 2005 || Kitt Peak || Spacewatch || — || align=right | 1.1 km || 
|-id=835 bgcolor=#E9E9E9
| 472835 ||  || — || September 20, 2003 || Kitt Peak || Spacewatch || — || align=right | 2.0 km || 
|-id=836 bgcolor=#fefefe
| 472836 ||  || — || September 30, 2013 || Mount Lemmon || Mount Lemmon Survey || — || align=right data-sort-value="0.60" | 600 m || 
|-id=837 bgcolor=#E9E9E9
| 472837 ||  || — || April 25, 2006 || Mount Lemmon || Mount Lemmon Survey || — || align=right | 2.2 km || 
|-id=838 bgcolor=#fefefe
| 472838 ||  || — || December 4, 2007 || Mount Lemmon || Mount Lemmon Survey || — || align=right data-sort-value="0.87" | 870 m || 
|-id=839 bgcolor=#E9E9E9
| 472839 ||  || — || March 13, 2007 || Mount Lemmon || Mount Lemmon Survey || — || align=right | 1.9 km || 
|-id=840 bgcolor=#E9E9E9
| 472840 ||  || — || May 15, 2007 || Kitt Peak || Spacewatch || — || align=right | 1.4 km || 
|-id=841 bgcolor=#fefefe
| 472841 ||  || — || March 1, 2008 || Kitt Peak || Spacewatch || — || align=right data-sort-value="0.79" | 790 m || 
|-id=842 bgcolor=#fefefe
| 472842 ||  || — || December 1, 2006 || Mount Lemmon || Mount Lemmon Survey || — || align=right data-sort-value="0.94" | 940 m || 
|-id=843 bgcolor=#E9E9E9
| 472843 ||  || — || March 25, 2007 || Mount Lemmon || Mount Lemmon Survey || — || align=right | 2.0 km || 
|-id=844 bgcolor=#E9E9E9
| 472844 ||  || — || March 27, 2011 || Mount Lemmon || Mount Lemmon Survey || — || align=right | 1.1 km || 
|-id=845 bgcolor=#E9E9E9
| 472845 ||  || — || April 18, 2001 || Kitt Peak || Spacewatch || — || align=right | 2.8 km || 
|-id=846 bgcolor=#d6d6d6
| 472846 ||  || — || March 27, 2004 || Kitt Peak || Spacewatch || — || align=right | 2.6 km || 
|-id=847 bgcolor=#fefefe
| 472847 ||  || — || December 25, 2000 || Kitt Peak || Spacewatch || — || align=right data-sort-value="0.80" | 800 m || 
|-id=848 bgcolor=#d6d6d6
| 472848 ||  || — || April 14, 2004 || Kitt Peak || Spacewatch || — || align=right | 3.5 km || 
|-id=849 bgcolor=#E9E9E9
| 472849 ||  || — || December 11, 2004 || Kitt Peak || Spacewatch || — || align=right | 2.0 km || 
|-id=850 bgcolor=#E9E9E9
| 472850 ||  || — || January 7, 2010 || Mount Lemmon || Mount Lemmon Survey || JUN || align=right data-sort-value="0.80" | 800 m || 
|-id=851 bgcolor=#E9E9E9
| 472851 ||  || — || January 11, 1994 || Kitt Peak || Spacewatch || — || align=right | 1.2 km || 
|-id=852 bgcolor=#E9E9E9
| 472852 ||  || — || April 9, 2010 || WISE || WISE || — || align=right | 2.5 km || 
|-id=853 bgcolor=#E9E9E9
| 472853 ||  || — || September 16, 2012 || Catalina || CSS || — || align=right | 1.3 km || 
|-id=854 bgcolor=#E9E9E9
| 472854 ||  || — || June 17, 2007 || Siding Spring || SSS || EUN || align=right | 1.6 km || 
|-id=855 bgcolor=#d6d6d6
| 472855 ||  || — || November 1, 2006 || Mount Lemmon || Mount Lemmon Survey || — || align=right | 2.8 km || 
|-id=856 bgcolor=#d6d6d6
| 472856 ||  || — || September 14, 2007 || Mount Lemmon || Mount Lemmon Survey || — || align=right | 3.5 km || 
|-id=857 bgcolor=#fefefe
| 472857 ||  || — || October 19, 2003 || Kitt Peak || Spacewatch || — || align=right data-sort-value="0.77" | 770 m || 
|-id=858 bgcolor=#E9E9E9
| 472858 ||  || — || April 20, 2006 || Mount Lemmon || Mount Lemmon Survey || JUN || align=right data-sort-value="0.77" | 770 m || 
|-id=859 bgcolor=#E9E9E9
| 472859 ||  || — || January 26, 2006 || Kitt Peak || Spacewatch || — || align=right | 1.5 km || 
|-id=860 bgcolor=#d6d6d6
| 472860 ||  || — || June 12, 2005 || Kitt Peak || Spacewatch || — || align=right | 3.8 km || 
|-id=861 bgcolor=#d6d6d6
| 472861 ||  || — || November 4, 2007 || Kitt Peak || Spacewatch || EOS || align=right | 2.2 km || 
|-id=862 bgcolor=#d6d6d6
| 472862 ||  || — || September 23, 2006 || Kitt Peak || Spacewatch || EOS || align=right | 1.8 km || 
|-id=863 bgcolor=#fefefe
| 472863 ||  || — || April 12, 2011 || Mount Lemmon || Mount Lemmon Survey || — || align=right | 1.1 km || 
|-id=864 bgcolor=#d6d6d6
| 472864 ||  || — || December 29, 2008 || Mount Lemmon || Mount Lemmon Survey || — || align=right | 3.9 km || 
|-id=865 bgcolor=#E9E9E9
| 472865 ||  || — || January 24, 1996 || Kitt Peak || Spacewatch || GEF || align=right | 1.6 km || 
|-id=866 bgcolor=#d6d6d6
| 472866 ||  || — || February 4, 2009 || Mount Lemmon || Mount Lemmon Survey || EOS || align=right | 2.3 km || 
|-id=867 bgcolor=#d6d6d6
| 472867 ||  || — || April 23, 2010 || WISE || WISE || LIX || align=right | 2.3 km || 
|-id=868 bgcolor=#d6d6d6
| 472868 ||  || — || January 30, 2006 || Kitt Peak || Spacewatch || 3:2 || align=right | 4.2 km || 
|-id=869 bgcolor=#E9E9E9
| 472869 ||  || — || November 19, 2009 || Kitt Peak || Spacewatch || KON || align=right | 3.1 km || 
|-id=870 bgcolor=#E9E9E9
| 472870 ||  || — || April 24, 2007 || Mount Lemmon || Mount Lemmon Survey || — || align=right | 1.1 km || 
|-id=871 bgcolor=#d6d6d6
| 472871 ||  || — || December 5, 2007 || Kitt Peak || Spacewatch || EOS || align=right | 2.3 km || 
|-id=872 bgcolor=#d6d6d6
| 472872 ||  || — || March 29, 2009 || Catalina || CSS || — || align=right | 2.1 km || 
|-id=873 bgcolor=#E9E9E9
| 472873 ||  || — || January 8, 2010 || Mount Lemmon || Mount Lemmon Survey || — || align=right | 1.4 km || 
|-id=874 bgcolor=#d6d6d6
| 472874 ||  || — || March 1, 2009 || Mount Lemmon || Mount Lemmon Survey || EOS || align=right | 1.8 km || 
|-id=875 bgcolor=#d6d6d6
| 472875 ||  || — || February 25, 2003 || Campo Imperatore || CINEOS || — || align=right | 3.1 km || 
|-id=876 bgcolor=#d6d6d6
| 472876 ||  || — || April 28, 2010 || WISE || WISE || — || align=right | 4.0 km || 
|-id=877 bgcolor=#d6d6d6
| 472877 ||  || — || December 20, 2007 || Kitt Peak || Spacewatch || — || align=right | 3.7 km || 
|-id=878 bgcolor=#E9E9E9
| 472878 ||  || — || September 4, 2008 || Kitt Peak || Spacewatch || — || align=right | 1.0 km || 
|-id=879 bgcolor=#fefefe
| 472879 ||  || — || January 11, 2011 || Kitt Peak || Spacewatch || — || align=right data-sort-value="0.67" | 670 m || 
|-id=880 bgcolor=#fefefe
| 472880 ||  || — || June 6, 2005 || Kitt Peak || Spacewatch || V || align=right data-sort-value="0.65" | 650 m || 
|-id=881 bgcolor=#fefefe
| 472881 ||  || — || April 21, 2012 || Mount Lemmon || Mount Lemmon Survey || — || align=right data-sort-value="0.90" | 900 m || 
|-id=882 bgcolor=#E9E9E9
| 472882 ||  || — || August 21, 2008 || Kitt Peak || Spacewatch || — || align=right | 1.00 km || 
|-id=883 bgcolor=#d6d6d6
| 472883 ||  || — || February 5, 2009 || Kitt Peak || Spacewatch || — || align=right | 2.4 km || 
|-id=884 bgcolor=#E9E9E9
| 472884 ||  || — || February 16, 2010 || Kitt Peak || Spacewatch || — || align=right | 1.9 km || 
|-id=885 bgcolor=#fefefe
| 472885 ||  || — || September 28, 2009 || Mount Lemmon || Mount Lemmon Survey || — || align=right data-sort-value="0.87" | 870 m || 
|-id=886 bgcolor=#fefefe
| 472886 ||  || — || December 6, 2010 || Mount Lemmon || Mount Lemmon Survey || — || align=right data-sort-value="0.67" | 670 m || 
|-id=887 bgcolor=#d6d6d6
| 472887 ||  || — || May 16, 2010 || Mount Lemmon || Mount Lemmon Survey || THB || align=right | 2.9 km || 
|-id=888 bgcolor=#E9E9E9
| 472888 ||  || — || December 18, 2004 || Mount Lemmon || Mount Lemmon Survey || — || align=right | 2.0 km || 
|-id=889 bgcolor=#E9E9E9
| 472889 ||  || — || January 22, 1993 || Kitt Peak || Spacewatch || — || align=right | 1.2 km || 
|-id=890 bgcolor=#E9E9E9
| 472890 ||  || — || May 23, 2006 || Kitt Peak || Spacewatch || DOR || align=right | 2.1 km || 
|-id=891 bgcolor=#E9E9E9
| 472891 ||  || — || November 21, 2008 || Kitt Peak || Spacewatch || — || align=right | 1.8 km || 
|-id=892 bgcolor=#E9E9E9
| 472892 ||  || — || November 2, 2008 || Mount Lemmon || Mount Lemmon Survey || PAD || align=right | 1.8 km || 
|-id=893 bgcolor=#d6d6d6
| 472893 ||  || — || November 8, 2007 || Mount Lemmon || Mount Lemmon Survey || — || align=right | 2.6 km || 
|-id=894 bgcolor=#fefefe
| 472894 ||  || — || January 5, 2000 || Kitt Peak || Spacewatch || — || align=right data-sort-value="0.92" | 920 m || 
|-id=895 bgcolor=#d6d6d6
| 472895 ||  || — || November 3, 2007 || Mount Lemmon || Mount Lemmon Survey || — || align=right | 3.2 km || 
|-id=896 bgcolor=#fefefe
| 472896 ||  || — || January 28, 2007 || Mount Lemmon || Mount Lemmon Survey || — || align=right | 3.2 km || 
|-id=897 bgcolor=#fefefe
| 472897 ||  || — || October 1, 2005 || Mount Lemmon || Mount Lemmon Survey || — || align=right data-sort-value="0.85" | 850 m || 
|-id=898 bgcolor=#E9E9E9
| 472898 ||  || — || January 2, 2011 || Mount Lemmon || Mount Lemmon Survey || — || align=right | 1.5 km || 
|-id=899 bgcolor=#d6d6d6
| 472899 ||  || — || September 25, 2006 || Mount Lemmon || Mount Lemmon Survey || — || align=right | 2.4 km || 
|-id=900 bgcolor=#E9E9E9
| 472900 ||  || — || October 9, 1999 || Socorro || LINEAR || — || align=right | 1.9 km || 
|}

472901–473000 

|-bgcolor=#d6d6d6
| 472901 ||  || — || September 17, 2006 || Kitt Peak || Spacewatch || — || align=right | 3.1 km || 
|-id=902 bgcolor=#d6d6d6
| 472902 ||  || — || November 2, 2007 || Kitt Peak || Spacewatch || — || align=right | 3.2 km || 
|-id=903 bgcolor=#d6d6d6
| 472903 ||  || — || November 1, 2007 || Kitt Peak || Spacewatch || — || align=right | 2.7 km || 
|-id=904 bgcolor=#fefefe
| 472904 ||  || — || March 27, 2008 || Kitt Peak || Spacewatch || — || align=right | 1.00 km || 
|-id=905 bgcolor=#E9E9E9
| 472905 ||  || — || October 2, 2008 || Kitt Peak || Spacewatch || — || align=right | 2.2 km || 
|-id=906 bgcolor=#E9E9E9
| 472906 ||  || — || October 24, 2008 || Catalina || CSS || EUN || align=right | 1.9 km || 
|-id=907 bgcolor=#E9E9E9
| 472907 ||  || — || October 31, 2008 || Mount Lemmon || Mount Lemmon Survey || EUN || align=right | 1.6 km || 
|-id=908 bgcolor=#E9E9E9
| 472908 ||  || — || December 25, 2005 || Mount Lemmon || Mount Lemmon Survey || — || align=right | 1.9 km || 
|-id=909 bgcolor=#E9E9E9
| 472909 ||  || — || March 13, 2002 || Socorro || LINEAR || — || align=right | 1.8 km || 
|-id=910 bgcolor=#E9E9E9
| 472910 ||  || — || March 26, 2011 || Kitt Peak || Spacewatch || — || align=right | 1.0 km || 
|-id=911 bgcolor=#E9E9E9
| 472911 ||  || — || May 10, 2007 || Kitt Peak || Spacewatch || — || align=right data-sort-value="0.89" | 890 m || 
|-id=912 bgcolor=#fefefe
| 472912 ||  || — || October 9, 2005 || Kitt Peak || Spacewatch || — || align=right | 1.1 km || 
|-id=913 bgcolor=#d6d6d6
| 472913 ||  || — || November 16, 2006 || Mount Lemmon || Mount Lemmon Survey || — || align=right | 3.1 km || 
|-id=914 bgcolor=#fefefe
| 472914 ||  || — || April 2, 2005 || Mount Lemmon || Mount Lemmon Survey || — || align=right data-sort-value="0.86" | 860 m || 
|-id=915 bgcolor=#fefefe
| 472915 ||  || — || March 5, 2008 || Kitt Peak || Spacewatch || — || align=right data-sort-value="0.79" | 790 m || 
|-id=916 bgcolor=#E9E9E9
| 472916 ||  || — || October 31, 2008 || Kitt Peak || Spacewatch ||  || align=right | 1.7 km || 
|-id=917 bgcolor=#fefefe
| 472917 ||  || — || August 27, 2006 || Kitt Peak || Spacewatch || — || align=right data-sort-value="0.59" | 590 m || 
|-id=918 bgcolor=#d6d6d6
| 472918 ||  || — || November 4, 2007 || Kitt Peak || Spacewatch || — || align=right | 2.3 km || 
|-id=919 bgcolor=#d6d6d6
| 472919 ||  || — || October 31, 2006 || Mount Lemmon || Mount Lemmon Survey || — || align=right | 3.1 km || 
|-id=920 bgcolor=#E9E9E9
| 472920 ||  || — || April 13, 2011 || Mount Lemmon || Mount Lemmon Survey || — || align=right data-sort-value="0.96" | 960 m || 
|-id=921 bgcolor=#E9E9E9
| 472921 ||  || — || April 11, 2007 || Catalina || CSS || — || align=right | 1.2 km || 
|-id=922 bgcolor=#E9E9E9
| 472922 ||  || — || April 17, 2007 || Catalina || CSS || — || align=right | 1.2 km || 
|-id=923 bgcolor=#E9E9E9
| 472923 ||  || — || February 10, 2010 || Kitt Peak || Spacewatch || — || align=right | 1.6 km || 
|-id=924 bgcolor=#d6d6d6
| 472924 ||  || — || March 9, 2005 || Mount Lemmon || Mount Lemmon Survey || — || align=right | 1.7 km || 
|-id=925 bgcolor=#d6d6d6
| 472925 ||  || — || May 19, 2010 || Mount Lemmon || Mount Lemmon Survey || EOS || align=right | 1.6 km || 
|-id=926 bgcolor=#E9E9E9
| 472926 ||  || — || March 20, 2007 || Kitt Peak || Spacewatch || — || align=right data-sort-value="0.99" | 990 m || 
|-id=927 bgcolor=#fefefe
| 472927 ||  || — || January 28, 2011 || Catalina || CSS || — || align=right data-sort-value="0.91" | 910 m || 
|-id=928 bgcolor=#fefefe
| 472928 ||  || — || February 29, 2008 || Kitt Peak || Spacewatch || — || align=right data-sort-value="0.86" | 860 m || 
|-id=929 bgcolor=#fefefe
| 472929 ||  || — || October 4, 1999 || Kitt Peak || Spacewatch || — || align=right data-sort-value="0.83" | 830 m || 
|-id=930 bgcolor=#E9E9E9
| 472930 ||  || — || March 5, 2006 || Kitt Peak || Spacewatch || — || align=right | 1.3 km || 
|-id=931 bgcolor=#E9E9E9
| 472931 ||  || — || November 30, 2005 || Mount Lemmon || Mount Lemmon Survey || — || align=right | 1.0 km || 
|-id=932 bgcolor=#E9E9E9
| 472932 ||  || — || April 9, 2006 || Mount Lemmon || Mount Lemmon Survey || — || align=right | 2.0 km || 
|-id=933 bgcolor=#d6d6d6
| 472933 ||  || — || March 16, 2004 || Socorro || LINEAR || — || align=right | 3.3 km || 
|-id=934 bgcolor=#d6d6d6
| 472934 ||  || — || December 18, 2007 || Mount Lemmon || Mount Lemmon Survey || — || align=right | 3.4 km || 
|-id=935 bgcolor=#E9E9E9
| 472935 ||  || — || January 28, 2014 || Mount Lemmon || Mount Lemmon Survey || — || align=right | 1.9 km || 
|-id=936 bgcolor=#E9E9E9
| 472936 ||  || — || January 31, 2006 || Catalina || CSS || — || align=right | 1.5 km || 
|-id=937 bgcolor=#E9E9E9
| 472937 ||  || — || August 26, 2012 || Kitt Peak || Spacewatch || — || align=right | 2.4 km || 
|-id=938 bgcolor=#d6d6d6
| 472938 ||  || — || January 24, 2010 || WISE || WISE || NAE || align=right | 2.7 km || 
|-id=939 bgcolor=#E9E9E9
| 472939 ||  || — || December 30, 2013 || Mount Lemmon || Mount Lemmon Survey || — || align=right | 1.6 km || 
|-id=940 bgcolor=#E9E9E9
| 472940 ||  || — || December 10, 2004 || Kitt Peak || Spacewatch || — || align=right | 2.2 km || 
|-id=941 bgcolor=#d6d6d6
| 472941 ||  || — || April 7, 2010 || WISE || WISE || — || align=right | 4.7 km || 
|-id=942 bgcolor=#E9E9E9
| 472942 ||  || — || April 2, 2006 || Anderson Mesa || LONEOS || — || align=right | 2.8 km || 
|-id=943 bgcolor=#fefefe
| 472943 ||  || — || March 3, 2000 || Kitt Peak || Spacewatch || NYS || align=right data-sort-value="0.68" | 680 m || 
|-id=944 bgcolor=#d6d6d6
| 472944 ||  || — || March 10, 1999 || Kitt Peak || Spacewatch || — || align=right | 2.3 km || 
|-id=945 bgcolor=#E9E9E9
| 472945 ||  || — || May 22, 2011 || Mount Lemmon || Mount Lemmon Survey || 526 || align=right | 2.1 km || 
|-id=946 bgcolor=#E9E9E9
| 472946 ||  || — || October 4, 2007 || Kitt Peak || Spacewatch || — || align=right | 2.4 km || 
|-id=947 bgcolor=#d6d6d6
| 472947 ||  || — || March 17, 2004 || Kitt Peak || Spacewatch || — || align=right | 2.2 km || 
|-id=948 bgcolor=#fefefe
| 472948 ||  || — || March 23, 2004 || Kitt Peak || Spacewatch || — || align=right data-sort-value="0.66" | 660 m || 
|-id=949 bgcolor=#E9E9E9
| 472949 ||  || — || January 30, 2006 || Kitt Peak || Spacewatch || — || align=right | 1.4 km || 
|-id=950 bgcolor=#E9E9E9
| 472950 ||  || — || October 22, 2003 || Kitt Peak || Spacewatch || — || align=right | 2.2 km || 
|-id=951 bgcolor=#E9E9E9
| 472951 ||  || — || September 12, 2007 || Mount Lemmon || Mount Lemmon Survey || — || align=right | 2.2 km || 
|-id=952 bgcolor=#fefefe
| 472952 ||  || — || March 4, 2005 || Catalina || CSS || — || align=right data-sort-value="0.72" | 720 m || 
|-id=953 bgcolor=#d6d6d6
| 472953 ||  || — || April 9, 2010 || Mount Lemmon || Mount Lemmon Survey || — || align=right | 2.0 km || 
|-id=954 bgcolor=#E9E9E9
| 472954 ||  || — || March 5, 2006 || Kitt Peak || Spacewatch || — || align=right | 2.0 km || 
|-id=955 bgcolor=#E9E9E9
| 472955 ||  || — || December 30, 2008 || Kitt Peak || Spacewatch || — || align=right | 2.7 km || 
|-id=956 bgcolor=#E9E9E9
| 472956 ||  || — || February 16, 2010 || WISE || WISE || — || align=right | 1.1 km || 
|-id=957 bgcolor=#fefefe
| 472957 ||  || — || November 18, 2009 || Kitt Peak || Spacewatch || — || align=right | 1.2 km || 
|-id=958 bgcolor=#fefefe
| 472958 ||  || — || November 23, 2006 || Mount Lemmon || Mount Lemmon Survey || — || align=right data-sort-value="0.97" | 970 m || 
|-id=959 bgcolor=#E9E9E9
| 472959 ||  || — || February 25, 2006 || Anderson Mesa || LONEOS || ADE || align=right | 2.3 km || 
|-id=960 bgcolor=#E9E9E9
| 472960 ||  || — || September 15, 2012 || Catalina || CSS || — || align=right | 1.5 km || 
|-id=961 bgcolor=#E9E9E9
| 472961 ||  || — || December 18, 2004 || Mount Lemmon || Mount Lemmon Survey || AGN || align=right | 1.2 km || 
|-id=962 bgcolor=#d6d6d6
| 472962 ||  || — || January 20, 2009 || Kitt Peak || Spacewatch || — || align=right | 2.6 km || 
|-id=963 bgcolor=#E9E9E9
| 472963 ||  || — || March 2, 2011 || Kitt Peak || Spacewatch || — || align=right | 1.1 km || 
|-id=964 bgcolor=#d6d6d6
| 472964 ||  || — || November 18, 2006 || Mount Lemmon || Mount Lemmon Survey || 7:4 || align=right | 3.7 km || 
|-id=965 bgcolor=#E9E9E9
| 472965 ||  || — || October 5, 2004 || Anderson Mesa || LONEOS || RAF || align=right | 1.2 km || 
|-id=966 bgcolor=#E9E9E9
| 472966 ||  || — || February 16, 2002 || Kitt Peak || Spacewatch || — || align=right | 1.4 km || 
|-id=967 bgcolor=#fefefe
| 472967 ||  || — || November 16, 2006 || Kitt Peak || Spacewatch || V || align=right data-sort-value="0.58" | 580 m || 
|-id=968 bgcolor=#fefefe
| 472968 ||  || — || April 4, 2008 || Kitt Peak || Spacewatch || V || align=right data-sort-value="0.61" | 610 m || 
|-id=969 bgcolor=#E9E9E9
| 472969 ||  || — || December 17, 2009 || Mount Lemmon || Mount Lemmon Survey || — || align=right | 1.8 km || 
|-id=970 bgcolor=#d6d6d6
| 472970 ||  || — || February 14, 2010 || Kitt Peak || Spacewatch || — || align=right | 2.5 km || 
|-id=971 bgcolor=#fefefe
| 472971 ||  || — || September 29, 2009 || Mount Lemmon || Mount Lemmon Survey || — || align=right data-sort-value="0.94" | 940 m || 
|-id=972 bgcolor=#E9E9E9
| 472972 ||  || — || April 2, 2006 || Kitt Peak || Spacewatch || AEO || align=right | 1.1 km || 
|-id=973 bgcolor=#d6d6d6
| 472973 ||  || — || November 12, 2012 || Mount Lemmon || Mount Lemmon Survey || — || align=right | 3.1 km || 
|-id=974 bgcolor=#E9E9E9
| 472974 ||  || — || October 6, 2008 || Mount Lemmon || Mount Lemmon Survey || AGN || align=right | 1.0 km || 
|-id=975 bgcolor=#E9E9E9
| 472975 ||  || — || March 18, 2010 || Mount Lemmon || Mount Lemmon Survey || DOR || align=right | 3.2 km || 
|-id=976 bgcolor=#E9E9E9
| 472976 ||  || — || October 7, 2008 || Mount Lemmon || Mount Lemmon Survey || — || align=right | 2.9 km || 
|-id=977 bgcolor=#E9E9E9
| 472977 ||  || — || February 14, 2010 || Mount Lemmon || Mount Lemmon Survey || — || align=right | 1.9 km || 
|-id=978 bgcolor=#E9E9E9
| 472978 ||  || — || January 20, 2006 || Kitt Peak || Spacewatch || — || align=right | 2.1 km || 
|-id=979 bgcolor=#E9E9E9
| 472979 ||  || — || October 29, 2008 || Kitt Peak || Spacewatch || — || align=right | 1.7 km || 
|-id=980 bgcolor=#d6d6d6
| 472980 ||  || — || January 2, 2009 || Kitt Peak || Spacewatch || EOS || align=right | 2.4 km || 
|-id=981 bgcolor=#E9E9E9
| 472981 ||  || — || February 2, 2006 || Kitt Peak || Spacewatch || — || align=right | 1.4 km || 
|-id=982 bgcolor=#d6d6d6
| 472982 ||  || — || March 3, 2009 || Catalina || CSS || — || align=right | 3.3 km || 
|-id=983 bgcolor=#d6d6d6
| 472983 ||  || — || August 28, 2006 || Kitt Peak || Spacewatch || — || align=right | 2.5 km || 
|-id=984 bgcolor=#E9E9E9
| 472984 ||  || — || January 12, 2010 || Kitt Peak || Spacewatch || — || align=right | 2.1 km || 
|-id=985 bgcolor=#d6d6d6
| 472985 ||  || — || April 10, 2010 || Kitt Peak || Spacewatch || — || align=right | 2.2 km || 
|-id=986 bgcolor=#d6d6d6
| 472986 ||  || — || March 17, 2004 || Kitt Peak || Spacewatch || EOS || align=right | 1.8 km || 
|-id=987 bgcolor=#E9E9E9
| 472987 ||  || — || September 12, 2007 || Kitt Peak || Spacewatch || — || align=right | 2.4 km || 
|-id=988 bgcolor=#d6d6d6
| 472988 ||  || — || February 24, 2009 || Catalina || CSS || — || align=right | 4.0 km || 
|-id=989 bgcolor=#fefefe
| 472989 ||  || — || January 19, 2004 || Kitt Peak || Spacewatch || — || align=right data-sort-value="0.71" | 710 m || 
|-id=990 bgcolor=#fefefe
| 472990 ||  || — || April 12, 2004 || Kitt Peak || Spacewatch || — || align=right data-sort-value="0.92" | 920 m || 
|-id=991 bgcolor=#fefefe
| 472991 ||  || — || March 11, 2011 || Kitt Peak || Spacewatch || NYS || align=right data-sort-value="0.63" | 630 m || 
|-id=992 bgcolor=#fefefe
| 472992 ||  || — || March 17, 2004 || Kitt Peak || Spacewatch || NYS || align=right data-sort-value="0.60" | 600 m || 
|-id=993 bgcolor=#E9E9E9
| 472993 ||  || — || March 9, 2006 || Kitt Peak || Spacewatch || — || align=right | 1.8 km || 
|-id=994 bgcolor=#E9E9E9
| 472994 ||  || — || May 21, 2006 || Mount Lemmon || Mount Lemmon Survey || — || align=right | 2.2 km || 
|-id=995 bgcolor=#E9E9E9
| 472995 ||  || — || October 22, 2008 || Mount Lemmon || Mount Lemmon Survey || — || align=right | 2.0 km || 
|-id=996 bgcolor=#d6d6d6
| 472996 ||  || — || October 22, 2006 || Kitt Peak || Spacewatch || — || align=right | 3.0 km || 
|-id=997 bgcolor=#d6d6d6
| 472997 ||  || — || August 18, 2006 || Kitt Peak || Spacewatch || — || align=right | 3.1 km || 
|-id=998 bgcolor=#E9E9E9
| 472998 ||  || — || February 22, 2006 || Catalina || CSS || — || align=right | 1.6 km || 
|-id=999 bgcolor=#E9E9E9
| 472999 ||  || — || May 2, 2003 || Kitt Peak || Spacewatch || — || align=right | 2.7 km || 
|-id=000 bgcolor=#E9E9E9
| 473000 ||  || — || June 12, 2007 || Kitt Peak || Spacewatch || — || align=right | 1.2 km || 
|}

References

External links 
 Discovery Circumstances: Numbered Minor Planets (470001)–(475000) (IAU Minor Planet Center)

0472